

523001–523100 

|-bgcolor=#d6d6d6
| 523001 ||  || — || November 2, 2007 || Kitt Peak || Spacewatch ||  || align=right | 2.2 km || 
|-id=002 bgcolor=#E9E9E9
| 523002 ||  || — || October 4, 2007 || Kitt Peak || Spacewatch ||  || align=right | 2.4 km || 
|-id=003 bgcolor=#d6d6d6
| 523003 ||  || — || September 18, 2006 || Kitt Peak || Spacewatch ||  || align=right | 2.7 km || 
|-id=004 bgcolor=#d6d6d6
| 523004 ||  || — || May 19, 2005 || Mount Lemmon || Mount Lemmon Survey ||  || align=right | 2.2 km || 
|-id=005 bgcolor=#fefefe
| 523005 ||  || — || February 25, 2011 || Mount Lemmon || Mount Lemmon Survey ||  || align=right data-sort-value="0.69" | 690 m || 
|-id=006 bgcolor=#d6d6d6
| 523006 ||  || — || September 26, 2011 || Haleakala || Pan-STARRS ||  || align=right | 2.1 km || 
|-id=007 bgcolor=#E9E9E9
| 523007 ||  || — || October 18, 2012 || Haleakala || Pan-STARRS ||  || align=right | 1.6 km || 
|-id=008 bgcolor=#E9E9E9
| 523008 ||  || — || May 28, 2006 || Kitt Peak || Spacewatch ||  || align=right | 2.5 km || 
|-id=009 bgcolor=#E9E9E9
| 523009 ||  || — || April 19, 2007 || Kitt Peak || Spacewatch ||  || align=right data-sort-value="0.83" | 830 m || 
|-id=010 bgcolor=#E9E9E9
| 523010 ||  || — || November 18, 2008 || Kitt Peak || Spacewatch ||  || align=right | 1.1 km || 
|-id=011 bgcolor=#d6d6d6
| 523011 ||  || — || August 27, 2006 || Kitt Peak || Spacewatch ||  || align=right | 1.9 km || 
|-id=012 bgcolor=#E9E9E9
| 523012 ||  || — || September 23, 2008 || Mount Lemmon || Mount Lemmon Survey ||  || align=right data-sort-value="0.83" | 830 m || 
|-id=013 bgcolor=#d6d6d6
| 523013 ||  || — || August 27, 2006 || Kitt Peak || Spacewatch ||  || align=right | 1.9 km || 
|-id=014 bgcolor=#d6d6d6
| 523014 ||  || — || December 27, 2011 || Kitt Peak || Spacewatch ||  || align=right | 2.2 km || 
|-id=015 bgcolor=#E9E9E9
| 523015 ||  || — || April 5, 2014 || Haleakala || Pan-STARRS ||  || align=right | 2.1 km || 
|-id=016 bgcolor=#E9E9E9
| 523016 ||  || — || October 11, 2007 || Kitt Peak || Spacewatch ||  || align=right | 1.7 km || 
|-id=017 bgcolor=#E9E9E9
| 523017 ||  || — || October 10, 2007 || Mount Lemmon || Mount Lemmon Survey ||  || align=right | 1.9 km || 
|-id=018 bgcolor=#d6d6d6
| 523018 ||  || — || October 5, 2005 || Kitt Peak || Spacewatch ||  || align=right | 2.4 km || 
|-id=019 bgcolor=#d6d6d6
| 523019 ||  || — || August 10, 2016 || Haleakala || Pan-STARRS ||  || align=right | 2.8 km || 
|-id=020 bgcolor=#d6d6d6
| 523020 ||  || — || August 27, 2006 || Kitt Peak || Spacewatch ||  || align=right | 2.4 km || 
|-id=021 bgcolor=#d6d6d6
| 523021 ||  || — || September 13, 2005 || Kitt Peak || Spacewatch ||  || align=right | 2.4 km || 
|-id=022 bgcolor=#d6d6d6
| 523022 ||  || — || July 19, 2015 || Haleakala || Pan-STARRS ||  || align=right | 2.3 km || 
|-id=023 bgcolor=#d6d6d6
| 523023 ||  || — || January 25, 2006 || Kitt Peak || Spacewatch || 7:4 || align=right | 3.1 km || 
|-id=024 bgcolor=#d6d6d6
| 523024 ||  || — || February 25, 2007 || Kitt Peak || Spacewatch ||  || align=right | 2.4 km || 
|-id=025 bgcolor=#E9E9E9
| 523025 ||  || — || January 17, 2009 || Kitt Peak || Spacewatch ||  || align=right | 2.3 km || 
|-id=026 bgcolor=#fefefe
| 523026 ||  || — || February 28, 2008 || Kitt Peak || Spacewatch ||  || align=right data-sort-value="0.68" | 680 m || 
|-id=027 bgcolor=#E9E9E9
| 523027 ||  || — || March 17, 2005 || Kitt Peak || Spacewatch ||  || align=right | 2.3 km || 
|-id=028 bgcolor=#d6d6d6
| 523028 ||  || — || October 28, 2011 || Mount Lemmon || Mount Lemmon Survey ||  || align=right | 2.7 km || 
|-id=029 bgcolor=#fefefe
| 523029 ||  || — || May 8, 2008 || Mount Lemmon || Mount Lemmon Survey ||  || align=right data-sort-value="0.73" | 730 m || 
|-id=030 bgcolor=#fefefe
| 523030 ||  || — || August 31, 2005 || Kitt Peak || Spacewatch ||  || align=right data-sort-value="0.73" | 730 m || 
|-id=031 bgcolor=#E9E9E9
| 523031 ||  || — || October 20, 2012 || Haleakala || Pan-STARRS ||  || align=right | 1.6 km || 
|-id=032 bgcolor=#d6d6d6
| 523032 ||  || — || June 14, 2010 || Mount Lemmon || Mount Lemmon Survey ||  || align=right | 2.6 km || 
|-id=033 bgcolor=#d6d6d6
| 523033 ||  || — || October 13, 2006 || Kitt Peak || Spacewatch ||  || align=right | 2.9 km || 
|-id=034 bgcolor=#d6d6d6
| 523034 ||  || — || September 19, 2011 || Haleakala || Pan-STARRS ||  || align=right | 2.7 km || 
|-id=035 bgcolor=#d6d6d6
| 523035 ||  || — || September 2, 2010 || Mount Lemmon || Mount Lemmon Survey ||  || align=right | 3.4 km || 
|-id=036 bgcolor=#d6d6d6
| 523036 ||  || — || October 1, 2011 || Kitt Peak || Spacewatch ||  || align=right | 2.7 km || 
|-id=037 bgcolor=#E9E9E9
| 523037 ||  || — || October 28, 2008 || Kitt Peak || Spacewatch ||  || align=right | 1.2 km || 
|-id=038 bgcolor=#d6d6d6
| 523038 ||  || — || February 13, 2008 || Kitt Peak || Spacewatch ||  || align=right | 2.8 km || 
|-id=039 bgcolor=#E9E9E9
| 523039 ||  || — || September 23, 2008 || Kitt Peak || Spacewatch ||  || align=right data-sort-value="0.93" | 930 m || 
|-id=040 bgcolor=#fefefe
| 523040 ||  || — || April 20, 2015 || Haleakala || Pan-STARRS ||  || align=right data-sort-value="0.91" | 910 m || 
|-id=041 bgcolor=#d6d6d6
| 523041 ||  || — || February 13, 2008 || Kitt Peak || Spacewatch ||  || align=right | 2.8 km || 
|-id=042 bgcolor=#d6d6d6
| 523042 ||  || — || August 30, 2005 || Kitt Peak || Spacewatch ||  || align=right | 2.9 km || 
|-id=043 bgcolor=#fefefe
| 523043 ||  || — || August 26, 2012 || Kitt Peak || Spacewatch ||  || align=right | 1.0 km || 
|-id=044 bgcolor=#d6d6d6
| 523044 ||  || — || September 11, 2010 || Kitt Peak || Spacewatch || 7:4 || align=right | 2.8 km || 
|-id=045 bgcolor=#d6d6d6
| 523045 ||  || — || January 28, 2007 || Kitt Peak || Spacewatch ||  || align=right | 2.6 km || 
|-id=046 bgcolor=#FA8072
| 523046 ||  || — || November 17, 2001 || Socorro || LINEAR || H || align=right data-sort-value="0.73" | 730 m || 
|-id=047 bgcolor=#d6d6d6
| 523047 ||  || — || January 15, 2008 || Kitt Peak || Spacewatch ||  || align=right | 2.3 km || 
|-id=048 bgcolor=#fefefe
| 523048 ||  || — || January 19, 2015 || Mount Lemmon || Mount Lemmon Survey || H || align=right data-sort-value="0.81" | 810 m || 
|-id=049 bgcolor=#E9E9E9
| 523049 ||  || — || February 15, 2010 || Mount Lemmon || Mount Lemmon Survey ||  || align=right | 1.2 km || 
|-id=050 bgcolor=#fefefe
| 523050 ||  || — || July 6, 2013 || Haleakala || Pan-STARRS || H || align=right data-sort-value="0.66" | 660 m || 
|-id=051 bgcolor=#d6d6d6
| 523051 ||  || — || March 16, 2009 || Kitt Peak || Spacewatch ||  || align=right | 2.2 km || 
|-id=052 bgcolor=#d6d6d6
| 523052 ||  || — || June 13, 2005 || Mount Lemmon || Mount Lemmon Survey ||  || align=right | 2.4 km || 
|-id=053 bgcolor=#E9E9E9
| 523053 ||  || — || August 24, 2011 || Haleakala || Pan-STARRS ||  || align=right | 2.0 km || 
|-id=054 bgcolor=#E9E9E9
| 523054 ||  || — || November 14, 2007 || Kitt Peak || Spacewatch ||  || align=right | 2.0 km || 
|-id=055 bgcolor=#d6d6d6
| 523055 ||  || — || November 6, 2005 || Kitt Peak || Spacewatch ||  || align=right | 3.6 km || 
|-id=056 bgcolor=#E9E9E9
| 523056 ||  || — || January 28, 2014 || Mount Lemmon || Mount Lemmon Survey ||  || align=right | 1.3 km || 
|-id=057 bgcolor=#d6d6d6
| 523057 ||  || — || May 8, 2014 || Haleakala || Pan-STARRS ||  || align=right | 2.5 km || 
|-id=058 bgcolor=#E9E9E9
| 523058 ||  || — || September 3, 2007 || Catalina || CSS ||  || align=right | 1.3 km || 
|-id=059 bgcolor=#d6d6d6
| 523059 ||  || — || June 17, 2015 || Haleakala || Pan-STARRS ||  || align=right | 2.7 km || 
|-id=060 bgcolor=#E9E9E9
| 523060 ||  || — || August 17, 2016 || Haleakala || Pan-STARRS ||  || align=right | 1.4 km || 
|-id=061 bgcolor=#E9E9E9
| 523061 ||  || — || October 21, 2012 || Catalina || CSS ||  || align=right | 1.4 km || 
|-id=062 bgcolor=#d6d6d6
| 523062 ||  || — || April 30, 2009 || Kitt Peak || Spacewatch ||  || align=right | 3.2 km || 
|-id=063 bgcolor=#d6d6d6
| 523063 ||  || — || November 23, 2006 || Kitt Peak || Spacewatch ||  || align=right | 1.8 km || 
|-id=064 bgcolor=#E9E9E9
| 523064 ||  || — || February 24, 2014 || Haleakala || Pan-STARRS ||  || align=right | 1.1 km || 
|-id=065 bgcolor=#E9E9E9
| 523065 ||  || — || February 28, 2014 || Haleakala || Pan-STARRS ||  || align=right | 1.8 km || 
|-id=066 bgcolor=#d6d6d6
| 523066 ||  || — || October 25, 2011 || Haleakala || Pan-STARRS ||  || align=right | 2.3 km || 
|-id=067 bgcolor=#fefefe
| 523067 ||  || — || December 11, 2013 || Haleakala || Pan-STARRS ||  || align=right data-sort-value="0.75" | 750 m || 
|-id=068 bgcolor=#d6d6d6
| 523068 ||  || — || August 24, 2011 || Haleakala || Pan-STARRS ||  || align=right | 2.2 km || 
|-id=069 bgcolor=#d6d6d6
| 523069 ||  || — || April 18, 2015 || Haleakala || Pan-STARRS ||  || align=right | 2.0 km || 
|-id=070 bgcolor=#E9E9E9
| 523070 ||  || — || September 24, 2007 || Kitt Peak || Spacewatch ||  || align=right | 1.9 km || 
|-id=071 bgcolor=#E9E9E9
| 523071 ||  || — || October 22, 2012 || Haleakala || Pan-STARRS ||  || align=right | 1.3 km || 
|-id=072 bgcolor=#d6d6d6
| 523072 ||  || — || January 21, 2014 || Mount Lemmon || Mount Lemmon Survey ||  || align=right | 2.6 km || 
|-id=073 bgcolor=#d6d6d6
| 523073 ||  || — || January 18, 2012 || Kitt Peak || Spacewatch || 7:4 || align=right | 2.5 km || 
|-id=074 bgcolor=#E9E9E9
| 523074 ||  || — || September 21, 2011 || Haleakala || Pan-STARRS ||  || align=right | 2.2 km || 
|-id=075 bgcolor=#d6d6d6
| 523075 ||  || — || February 24, 2014 || Haleakala || Pan-STARRS ||  || align=right | 2.2 km || 
|-id=076 bgcolor=#E9E9E9
| 523076 ||  || — || January 9, 2014 || Haleakala || Pan-STARRS ||  || align=right | 2.1 km || 
|-id=077 bgcolor=#E9E9E9
| 523077 ||  || — || October 18, 2012 || Haleakala || Pan-STARRS ||  || align=right | 1.4 km || 
|-id=078 bgcolor=#d6d6d6
| 523078 ||  || — || June 20, 2015 || Haleakala || Pan-STARRS ||  || align=right | 3.7 km || 
|-id=079 bgcolor=#fefefe
| 523079 ||  || — || July 29, 2008 || Kitt Peak || Spacewatch ||  || align=right data-sort-value="0.85" | 850 m || 
|-id=080 bgcolor=#fefefe
| 523080 ||  || — || September 13, 2005 || Kitt Peak || Spacewatch ||  || align=right data-sort-value="0.79" | 790 m || 
|-id=081 bgcolor=#E9E9E9
| 523081 ||  || — || March 18, 2010 || Mount Lemmon || Mount Lemmon Survey ||  || align=right | 2.2 km || 
|-id=082 bgcolor=#E9E9E9
| 523082 ||  || — || February 28, 2014 || Mount Lemmon || Mount Lemmon Survey ||  || align=right data-sort-value="0.98" | 980 m || 
|-id=083 bgcolor=#d6d6d6
| 523083 ||  || — || January 1, 2008 || Kitt Peak || Spacewatch ||  || align=right | 2.7 km || 
|-id=084 bgcolor=#d6d6d6
| 523084 ||  || — || January 13, 2008 || Kitt Peak || Spacewatch ||  || align=right | 3.2 km || 
|-id=085 bgcolor=#d6d6d6
| 523085 ||  || — || April 30, 2009 || Kitt Peak || Spacewatch ||  || align=right | 2.6 km || 
|-id=086 bgcolor=#fefefe
| 523086 ||  || — || December 26, 2006 || Kitt Peak || Spacewatch ||  || align=right data-sort-value="0.79" | 790 m || 
|-id=087 bgcolor=#E9E9E9
| 523087 ||  || — || February 10, 2014 || Haleakala || Pan-STARRS ||  || align=right | 1.7 km || 
|-id=088 bgcolor=#E9E9E9
| 523088 ||  || — || February 14, 2010 || Mount Lemmon || Mount Lemmon Survey ||  || align=right | 1.6 km || 
|-id=089 bgcolor=#fefefe
| 523089 ||  || — || October 10, 2008 || Mount Lemmon || Mount Lemmon Survey || H || align=right data-sort-value="0.65" | 650 m || 
|-id=090 bgcolor=#E9E9E9
| 523090 ||  || — || November 7, 2012 || Haleakala || Pan-STARRS ||  || align=right | 1.2 km || 
|-id=091 bgcolor=#d6d6d6
| 523091 ||  || — || September 17, 2006 || Kitt Peak || Spacewatch ||  || align=right | 2.5 km || 
|-id=092 bgcolor=#E9E9E9
| 523092 ||  || — || October 30, 2007 || Kitt Peak || Spacewatch ||  || align=right | 2.6 km || 
|-id=093 bgcolor=#E9E9E9
| 523093 ||  || — || December 3, 2008 || Mount Lemmon || Mount Lemmon Survey ||  || align=right | 1.2 km || 
|-id=094 bgcolor=#E9E9E9
| 523094 ||  || — || October 18, 2007 || Kitt Peak || Spacewatch ||  || align=right | 1.7 km || 
|-id=095 bgcolor=#d6d6d6
| 523095 ||  || — || November 24, 2006 || Kitt Peak || Spacewatch ||  || align=right | 2.3 km || 
|-id=096 bgcolor=#d6d6d6
| 523096 ||  || — || November 19, 2006 || Kitt Peak || Spacewatch ||  || align=right | 3.2 km || 
|-id=097 bgcolor=#d6d6d6
| 523097 ||  || — || December 8, 2012 || Mount Lemmon || Mount Lemmon Survey ||  || align=right | 2.2 km || 
|-id=098 bgcolor=#E9E9E9
| 523098 ||  || — || November 27, 2012 || Mount Lemmon || Mount Lemmon Survey ||  || align=right | 1.8 km || 
|-id=099 bgcolor=#E9E9E9
| 523099 ||  || — || December 4, 2012 || Mount Lemmon || Mount Lemmon Survey ||  || align=right | 1.3 km || 
|-id=100 bgcolor=#d6d6d6
| 523100 ||  || — || August 18, 2006 || Kitt Peak || Spacewatch ||  || align=right | 2.0 km || 
|}

523101–523200 

|-bgcolor=#E9E9E9
| 523101 ||  || — || August 28, 2012 || Mount Lemmon || Mount Lemmon Survey ||  || align=right | 1.5 km || 
|-id=102 bgcolor=#E9E9E9
| 523102 ||  || — || September 21, 2003 || Kitt Peak || Spacewatch ||  || align=right | 1.1 km || 
|-id=103 bgcolor=#d6d6d6
| 523103 ||  || — || August 27, 2011 || Haleakala || Pan-STARRS ||  || align=right | 2.1 km || 
|-id=104 bgcolor=#d6d6d6
| 523104 ||  || — || September 21, 2011 || Kitt Peak || Spacewatch ||  || align=right | 2.3 km || 
|-id=105 bgcolor=#d6d6d6
| 523105 ||  || — || August 13, 2010 || Kitt Peak || Spacewatch ||  || align=right | 2.5 km || 
|-id=106 bgcolor=#E9E9E9
| 523106 ||  || — || July 28, 2011 || Haleakala || Pan-STARRS ||  || align=right | 1.6 km || 
|-id=107 bgcolor=#E9E9E9
| 523107 ||  || — || December 2, 2008 || Kitt Peak || Spacewatch ||  || align=right | 1.2 km || 
|-id=108 bgcolor=#E9E9E9
| 523108 ||  || — || February 11, 2014 || Mount Lemmon || Mount Lemmon Survey ||  || align=right | 1.1 km || 
|-id=109 bgcolor=#fefefe
| 523109 ||  || — || October 27, 2011 || Mount Lemmon || Mount Lemmon Survey || H || align=right data-sort-value="0.52" | 520 m || 
|-id=110 bgcolor=#fefefe
| 523110 ||  || — || December 10, 2006 || Kitt Peak || Spacewatch ||  || align=right | 1.0 km || 
|-id=111 bgcolor=#d6d6d6
| 523111 ||  || — || September 17, 2006 || Kitt Peak || Spacewatch ||  || align=right | 1.7 km || 
|-id=112 bgcolor=#d6d6d6
| 523112 ||  || — || February 13, 2008 || Kitt Peak || Spacewatch ||  || align=right | 3.1 km || 
|-id=113 bgcolor=#E9E9E9
| 523113 ||  || — || December 4, 2008 || Kitt Peak || Spacewatch ||  || align=right | 2.3 km || 
|-id=114 bgcolor=#E9E9E9
| 523114 ||  || — || October 7, 2007 || Kitt Peak || Spacewatch ||  || align=right | 1.9 km || 
|-id=115 bgcolor=#d6d6d6
| 523115 ||  || — || May 15, 2009 || Kitt Peak || Spacewatch ||  || align=right | 2.7 km || 
|-id=116 bgcolor=#E9E9E9
| 523116 ||  || — || May 16, 2010 || Mount Lemmon || Mount Lemmon Survey ||  || align=right | 2.3 km || 
|-id=117 bgcolor=#d6d6d6
| 523117 ||  || — || March 8, 2013 || Haleakala || Pan-STARRS ||  || align=right | 2.1 km || 
|-id=118 bgcolor=#E9E9E9
| 523118 ||  || — || February 9, 2014 || Mount Lemmon || Mount Lemmon Survey ||  || align=right | 1.5 km || 
|-id=119 bgcolor=#d6d6d6
| 523119 ||  || — || October 24, 2011 || Mount Lemmon || Mount Lemmon Survey ||  || align=right | 2.4 km || 
|-id=120 bgcolor=#d6d6d6
| 523120 ||  || — || February 5, 2013 || Kitt Peak || Spacewatch ||  || align=right | 2.5 km || 
|-id=121 bgcolor=#d6d6d6
| 523121 ||  || — || April 29, 2014 || Haleakala || Pan-STARRS ||  || align=right | 2.6 km || 
|-id=122 bgcolor=#d6d6d6
| 523122 ||  || — || December 19, 2007 || Kitt Peak || Spacewatch ||  || align=right | 1.9 km || 
|-id=123 bgcolor=#d6d6d6
| 523123 ||  || — || September 23, 2011 || Mount Lemmon || Mount Lemmon Survey ||  || align=right | 1.8 km || 
|-id=124 bgcolor=#fefefe
| 523124 ||  || — || September 16, 2009 || Kitt Peak || Spacewatch ||  || align=right data-sort-value="0.60" | 600 m || 
|-id=125 bgcolor=#d6d6d6
| 523125 ||  || — || October 20, 2006 || Kitt Peak || Spacewatch ||  || align=right | 2.2 km || 
|-id=126 bgcolor=#E9E9E9
| 523126 ||  || — || May 23, 2006 || Kitt Peak || Spacewatch ||  || align=right | 1.7 km || 
|-id=127 bgcolor=#E9E9E9
| 523127 ||  || — || November 9, 2007 || Mount Lemmon || Mount Lemmon Survey ||  || align=right | 1.8 km || 
|-id=128 bgcolor=#d6d6d6
| 523128 ||  || — || January 13, 2008 || Kitt Peak || Spacewatch ||  || align=right | 1.9 km || 
|-id=129 bgcolor=#d6d6d6
| 523129 ||  || — || February 2, 2008 || Kitt Peak || Spacewatch ||  || align=right | 1.9 km || 
|-id=130 bgcolor=#d6d6d6
| 523130 ||  || — || September 11, 1994 || Kitt Peak || Spacewatch ||  || align=right | 2.5 km || 
|-id=131 bgcolor=#d6d6d6
| 523131 ||  || — || September 17, 2010 || Mount Lemmon || Mount Lemmon Survey ||  || align=right | 2.1 km || 
|-id=132 bgcolor=#d6d6d6
| 523132 ||  || — || April 17, 2009 || Kitt Peak || Spacewatch ||  || align=right | 3.1 km || 
|-id=133 bgcolor=#fefefe
| 523133 ||  || — || October 23, 2009 || Kitt Peak || Spacewatch ||  || align=right data-sort-value="0.84" | 840 m || 
|-id=134 bgcolor=#E9E9E9
| 523134 ||  || — || May 20, 2014 || Haleakala || Pan-STARRS ||  || align=right | 1.3 km || 
|-id=135 bgcolor=#E9E9E9
| 523135 ||  || — || February 27, 2014 || Mount Lemmon || Mount Lemmon Survey ||  || align=right | 2.2 km || 
|-id=136 bgcolor=#E9E9E9
| 523136 ||  || — || February 26, 2014 || Mount Lemmon || Mount Lemmon Survey ||  || align=right | 2.1 km || 
|-id=137 bgcolor=#E9E9E9
| 523137 ||  || — || June 11, 2015 || Haleakala || Pan-STARRS ||  || align=right | 1.9 km || 
|-id=138 bgcolor=#E9E9E9
| 523138 ||  || — || February 27, 2014 || Haleakala || Pan-STARRS ||  || align=right | 1.00 km || 
|-id=139 bgcolor=#d6d6d6
| 523139 ||  || — || January 22, 2013 || Mount Lemmon || Mount Lemmon Survey ||  || align=right | 2.4 km || 
|-id=140 bgcolor=#E9E9E9
| 523140 ||  || — || January 4, 2013 || Mount Lemmon || Mount Lemmon Survey ||  || align=right | 1.9 km || 
|-id=141 bgcolor=#d6d6d6
| 523141 ||  || — || July 7, 2010 || Kitt Peak || Spacewatch ||  || align=right | 2.3 km || 
|-id=142 bgcolor=#fefefe
| 523142 ||  || — || June 15, 2015 || Haleakala || Pan-STARRS ||  || align=right data-sort-value="0.74" | 740 m || 
|-id=143 bgcolor=#E9E9E9
| 523143 ||  || — || March 25, 2014 || Mount Lemmon || Mount Lemmon Survey ||  || align=right | 1.7 km || 
|-id=144 bgcolor=#d6d6d6
| 523144 ||  || — || October 26, 2011 || Haleakala || Pan-STARRS ||  || align=right | 2.4 km || 
|-id=145 bgcolor=#fefefe
| 523145 ||  || — || September 19, 2009 || Mount Lemmon || Mount Lemmon Survey ||  || align=right data-sort-value="0.68" | 680 m || 
|-id=146 bgcolor=#d6d6d6
| 523146 ||  || — || September 7, 2011 || Kitt Peak || Spacewatch ||  || align=right | 1.9 km || 
|-id=147 bgcolor=#E9E9E9
| 523147 ||  || — || January 1, 2009 || Kitt Peak || Spacewatch ||  || align=right | 1.8 km || 
|-id=148 bgcolor=#d6d6d6
| 523148 ||  || — || October 27, 2005 || Kitt Peak || Spacewatch ||  || align=right | 2.9 km || 
|-id=149 bgcolor=#d6d6d6
| 523149 ||  || — || October 26, 2011 || Haleakala || Pan-STARRS ||  || align=right | 2.2 km || 
|-id=150 bgcolor=#fefefe
| 523150 ||  || — || October 24, 2008 || Kitt Peak || Spacewatch || H || align=right data-sort-value="0.69" | 690 m || 
|-id=151 bgcolor=#d6d6d6
| 523151 ||  || — || October 28, 2011 || Mount Lemmon || Mount Lemmon Survey ||  || align=right | 2.6 km || 
|-id=152 bgcolor=#fefefe
| 523152 ||  || — || January 29, 2015 || Haleakala || Pan-STARRS || H || align=right data-sort-value="0.64" | 640 m || 
|-id=153 bgcolor=#fefefe
| 523153 ||  || — || December 1, 2006 || Mount Lemmon || Mount Lemmon Survey || H || align=right data-sort-value="0.83" | 830 m || 
|-id=154 bgcolor=#E9E9E9
| 523154 ||  || — || January 30, 2004 || Kitt Peak || Spacewatch ||  || align=right | 2.1 km || 
|-id=155 bgcolor=#fefefe
| 523155 ||  || — || November 18, 2003 || Kitt Peak || Spacewatch || H || align=right data-sort-value="0.69" | 690 m || 
|-id=156 bgcolor=#fefefe
| 523156 ||  || — || October 26, 2011 || Haleakala || Pan-STARRS || H || align=right data-sort-value="0.64" | 640 m || 
|-id=157 bgcolor=#d6d6d6
| 523157 ||  || — || April 29, 2014 || Haleakala || Pan-STARRS ||  || align=right | 3.2 km || 
|-id=158 bgcolor=#fefefe
| 523158 ||  || — || April 24, 2011 || Mount Lemmon || Mount Lemmon Survey ||  || align=right data-sort-value="0.56" | 560 m || 
|-id=159 bgcolor=#E9E9E9
| 523159 ||  || — || October 15, 1999 || Kitt Peak || Spacewatch ||  || align=right | 1.7 km || 
|-id=160 bgcolor=#E9E9E9
| 523160 ||  || — || May 23, 2014 || Haleakala || Pan-STARRS ||  || align=right data-sort-value="0.86" | 860 m || 
|-id=161 bgcolor=#d6d6d6
| 523161 ||  || — || November 1, 2011 || Kitt Peak || Spacewatch ||  || align=right | 2.8 km || 
|-id=162 bgcolor=#E9E9E9
| 523162 ||  || — || June 13, 2015 || Haleakala || Pan-STARRS ||  || align=right | 1.3 km || 
|-id=163 bgcolor=#d6d6d6
| 523163 ||  || — || October 25, 2011 || Kitt Peak || Spacewatch ||  || align=right | 2.9 km || 
|-id=164 bgcolor=#d6d6d6
| 523164 ||  || — || June 17, 2005 || Mount Lemmon || Mount Lemmon Survey ||  || align=right | 2.6 km || 
|-id=165 bgcolor=#E9E9E9
| 523165 ||  || — || January 30, 2006 || Kitt Peak || Spacewatch ||  || align=right data-sort-value="0.95" | 950 m || 
|-id=166 bgcolor=#E9E9E9
| 523166 ||  || — || March 8, 2014 || Mount Lemmon || Mount Lemmon Survey ||  || align=right | 1.4 km || 
|-id=167 bgcolor=#E9E9E9
| 523167 ||  || — || October 15, 2007 || Kitt Peak || Spacewatch ||  || align=right | 1.6 km || 
|-id=168 bgcolor=#d6d6d6
| 523168 ||  || — || June 19, 2010 || Mount Lemmon || Mount Lemmon Survey ||  || align=right | 2.6 km || 
|-id=169 bgcolor=#E9E9E9
| 523169 ||  || — || December 30, 2008 || Mount Lemmon || Mount Lemmon Survey ||  || align=right | 2.1 km || 
|-id=170 bgcolor=#d6d6d6
| 523170 ||  || — || July 24, 2015 || Haleakala || Pan-STARRS || 7:4 || align=right | 3.1 km || 
|-id=171 bgcolor=#d6d6d6
| 523171 ||  || — || December 8, 2005 || Kitt Peak || Spacewatch ||  || align=right | 2.9 km || 
|-id=172 bgcolor=#d6d6d6
| 523172 ||  || — || May 14, 2009 || Kitt Peak || Spacewatch ||  || align=right | 2.7 km || 
|-id=173 bgcolor=#E9E9E9
| 523173 ||  || — || June 18, 2015 || Haleakala || Pan-STARRS ||  || align=right | 1.9 km || 
|-id=174 bgcolor=#d6d6d6
| 523174 ||  || — || January 14, 2008 || Kitt Peak || Spacewatch ||  || align=right | 2.9 km || 
|-id=175 bgcolor=#d6d6d6
| 523175 ||  || — || February 8, 2013 || Haleakala || Pan-STARRS ||  || align=right | 2.4 km || 
|-id=176 bgcolor=#d6d6d6
| 523176 ||  || — || February 20, 2009 || Kitt Peak || Spacewatch ||  || align=right | 2.3 km || 
|-id=177 bgcolor=#E9E9E9
| 523177 ||  || — || December 15, 2007 || Mount Lemmon || Mount Lemmon Survey ||  || align=right | 1.9 km || 
|-id=178 bgcolor=#E9E9E9
| 523178 ||  || — || August 28, 2011 || Siding Spring || SSS ||  || align=right | 2.5 km || 
|-id=179 bgcolor=#d6d6d6
| 523179 ||  || — || September 29, 2005 || Mount Lemmon || Mount Lemmon Survey ||  || align=right | 2.6 km || 
|-id=180 bgcolor=#d6d6d6
| 523180 ||  || — || August 10, 2015 || Haleakala || Pan-STARRS ||  || align=right | 2.1 km || 
|-id=181 bgcolor=#E9E9E9
| 523181 ||  || — || May 4, 2014 || Haleakala || Pan-STARRS ||  || align=right | 1.6 km || 
|-id=182 bgcolor=#d6d6d6
| 523182 ||  || — || October 1, 2005 || Kitt Peak || Spacewatch ||  || align=right | 2.4 km || 
|-id=183 bgcolor=#fefefe
| 523183 ||  || — || March 27, 2011 || Mount Lemmon || Mount Lemmon Survey ||  || align=right data-sort-value="0.72" | 720 m || 
|-id=184 bgcolor=#d6d6d6
| 523184 ||  || — || September 2, 2010 || Mount Lemmon || Mount Lemmon Survey ||  || align=right | 2.9 km || 
|-id=185 bgcolor=#E9E9E9
| 523185 ||  || — || March 27, 2014 || Haleakala || Pan-STARRS ||  || align=right | 1.6 km || 
|-id=186 bgcolor=#fefefe
| 523186 ||  || — || October 18, 2003 || Kitt Peak || Spacewatch || Hslow || align=right data-sort-value="0.53" | 530 m || 
|-id=187 bgcolor=#fefefe
| 523187 ||  || — || September 29, 2008 || Mount Lemmon || Mount Lemmon Survey || H || align=right data-sort-value="0.45" | 450 m || 
|-id=188 bgcolor=#fefefe
| 523188 ||  || — || March 6, 2011 || Kitt Peak || Spacewatch ||  || align=right data-sort-value="0.71" | 710 m || 
|-id=189 bgcolor=#fefefe
| 523189 ||  || — || November 19, 2003 || Kitt Peak || Spacewatch ||  || align=right data-sort-value="0.65" | 650 m || 
|-id=190 bgcolor=#fefefe
| 523190 ||  || — || October 26, 2009 || Mount Lemmon || Mount Lemmon Survey ||  || align=right data-sort-value="0.73" | 730 m || 
|-id=191 bgcolor=#E9E9E9
| 523191 ||  || — || February 28, 2009 || Kitt Peak || Spacewatch ||  || align=right | 2.0 km || 
|-id=192 bgcolor=#d6d6d6
| 523192 ||  || — || October 23, 2006 || Kitt Peak || Spacewatch ||  || align=right | 2.2 km || 
|-id=193 bgcolor=#d6d6d6
| 523193 ||  || — || October 25, 2011 || Kitt Peak || Spacewatch ||  || align=right | 2.7 km || 
|-id=194 bgcolor=#d6d6d6
| 523194 ||  || — || May 7, 2014 || Haleakala || Pan-STARRS ||  || align=right | 2.8 km || 
|-id=195 bgcolor=#E9E9E9
| 523195 ||  || — || December 7, 2012 || Mount Lemmon || Mount Lemmon Survey ||  || align=right | 1.5 km || 
|-id=196 bgcolor=#d6d6d6
| 523196 ||  || — || August 31, 2005 || Kitt Peak || Spacewatch ||  || align=right | 2.7 km || 
|-id=197 bgcolor=#d6d6d6
| 523197 ||  || — || September 12, 2015 || Haleakala || Pan-STARRS ||  || align=right | 2.7 km || 
|-id=198 bgcolor=#d6d6d6
| 523198 ||  || — || February 10, 2007 || Mount Lemmon || Mount Lemmon Survey ||  || align=right | 2.6 km || 
|-id=199 bgcolor=#d6d6d6
| 523199 ||  || — || May 7, 2014 || Haleakala || Pan-STARRS ||  || align=right | 2.4 km || 
|-id=200 bgcolor=#d6d6d6
| 523200 ||  || — || December 31, 2007 || Kitt Peak || Spacewatch ||  || align=right | 2.4 km || 
|}

523201–523300 

|-bgcolor=#E9E9E9
| 523201 ||  || — || December 4, 2012 || Mount Lemmon || Mount Lemmon Survey ||  || align=right data-sort-value="0.90" | 900 m || 
|-id=202 bgcolor=#E9E9E9
| 523202 ||  || — || December 29, 2008 || Kitt Peak || Spacewatch ||  || align=right data-sort-value="0.98" | 980 m || 
|-id=203 bgcolor=#E9E9E9
| 523203 ||  || — || January 17, 2013 || Haleakala || Pan-STARRS ||  || align=right | 2.2 km || 
|-id=204 bgcolor=#E9E9E9
| 523204 ||  || — || May 6, 2014 || Haleakala || Pan-STARRS ||  || align=right | 1.3 km || 
|-id=205 bgcolor=#d6d6d6
| 523205 ||  || — || August 20, 2015 || Kitt Peak || Spacewatch ||  || align=right | 2.2 km || 
|-id=206 bgcolor=#d6d6d6
| 523206 ||  || — || February 16, 2012 || Haleakala || Pan-STARRS ||  || align=right | 2.4 km || 
|-id=207 bgcolor=#d6d6d6
| 523207 ||  || — || October 29, 2010 || Mount Lemmon || Mount Lemmon Survey ||  || align=right | 2.4 km || 
|-id=208 bgcolor=#d6d6d6
| 523208 ||  || — || February 16, 2012 || Haleakala || Pan-STARRS ||  || align=right | 3.0 km || 
|-id=209 bgcolor=#d6d6d6
| 523209 ||  || — || November 14, 2010 || Mount Lemmon || Mount Lemmon Survey ||  || align=right | 2.6 km || 
|-id=210 bgcolor=#d6d6d6
| 523210 ||  || — || December 29, 2011 || Mount Lemmon || Mount Lemmon Survey ||  || align=right | 2.2 km || 
|-id=211 bgcolor=#d6d6d6
| 523211 ||  || — || April 26, 2007 || Kitt Peak || Spacewatch ||  || align=right | 2.8 km || 
|-id=212 bgcolor=#E9E9E9
| 523212 ||  || — || January 20, 2008 || Kitt Peak || Spacewatch ||  || align=right | 2.1 km || 
|-id=213 bgcolor=#E9E9E9
| 523213 ||  || — || March 6, 2013 || Haleakala || Pan-STARRS ||  || align=right | 1.9 km || 
|-id=214 bgcolor=#E9E9E9
| 523214 ||  || — || October 24, 2011 || Haleakala || Pan-STARRS ||  || align=right | 1.4 km || 
|-id=215 bgcolor=#d6d6d6
| 523215 ||  || — || November 12, 2010 || Mount Lemmon || Mount Lemmon Survey ||  || align=right | 2.8 km || 
|-id=216 bgcolor=#d6d6d6
| 523216 ||  || — || October 24, 2015 || Haleakala || Pan-STARRS ||  || align=right | 2.5 km || 
|-id=217 bgcolor=#d6d6d6
| 523217 ||  || — || February 14, 2013 || Haleakala || Pan-STARRS ||  || align=right | 2.4 km || 
|-id=218 bgcolor=#d6d6d6
| 523218 ||  || — || May 1, 2010 || WISE || WISE ||  || align=right | 5.3 km || 
|-id=219 bgcolor=#fefefe
| 523219 ||  || — || May 3, 2003 || Kitt Peak || Spacewatch ||  || align=right data-sort-value="0.76" | 760 m || 
|-id=220 bgcolor=#fefefe
| 523220 ||  || — || February 12, 1999 || Kitt Peak || Spacewatch ||  || align=right data-sort-value="0.71" | 710 m || 
|-id=221 bgcolor=#E9E9E9
| 523221 ||  || — || May 6, 2014 || Haleakala || Pan-STARRS ||  || align=right | 1.5 km || 
|-id=222 bgcolor=#E9E9E9
| 523222 ||  || — || November 19, 2003 || Kitt Peak || Spacewatch ||  || align=right | 1.4 km || 
|-id=223 bgcolor=#d6d6d6
| 523223 ||  || — || January 27, 2007 || Mount Lemmon || Mount Lemmon Survey ||  || align=right | 2.8 km || 
|-id=224 bgcolor=#E9E9E9
| 523224 ||  || — || February 26, 2014 || Haleakala || Pan-STARRS ||  || align=right | 1.2 km || 
|-id=225 bgcolor=#E9E9E9
| 523225 ||  || — || May 12, 2010 || Siding Spring || SSS ||  || align=right | 1.3 km || 
|-id=226 bgcolor=#fefefe
| 523226 ||  || — || September 7, 2008 || Mount Lemmon || Mount Lemmon Survey ||  || align=right data-sort-value="0.94" | 940 m || 
|-id=227 bgcolor=#E9E9E9
| 523227 ||  || — || November 20, 2003 || Socorro || LINEAR ||  || align=right | 2.1 km || 
|-id=228 bgcolor=#E9E9E9
| 523228 ||  || — || September 26, 2011 || Haleakala || Pan-STARRS ||  || align=right | 1.9 km || 
|-id=229 bgcolor=#d6d6d6
| 523229 ||  || — || November 28, 2005 || Kitt Peak || Spacewatch ||  || align=right | 4.4 km || 
|-id=230 bgcolor=#d6d6d6
| 523230 ||  || — || May 25, 2014 || Haleakala || Pan-STARRS ||  || align=right | 2.9 km || 
|-id=231 bgcolor=#d6d6d6
| 523231 ||  || — || April 14, 2007 || Kitt Peak || Spacewatch ||  || align=right | 2.6 km || 
|-id=232 bgcolor=#E9E9E9
| 523232 ||  || — || October 10, 2007 || Mount Lemmon || Mount Lemmon Survey ||  || align=right data-sort-value="0.89" | 890 m || 
|-id=233 bgcolor=#d6d6d6
| 523233 ||  || — || September 19, 2009 || Mount Lemmon || Mount Lemmon Survey ||  || align=right | 2.5 km || 
|-id=234 bgcolor=#E9E9E9
| 523234 ||  || — || April 4, 2005 || Mount Lemmon || Mount Lemmon Survey ||  || align=right | 1.5 km || 
|-id=235 bgcolor=#E9E9E9
| 523235 ||  || — || October 24, 2011 || Haleakala || Pan-STARRS ||  || align=right | 2.2 km || 
|-id=236 bgcolor=#d6d6d6
| 523236 ||  || — || September 10, 2015 || Haleakala || Pan-STARRS ||  || align=right | 2.6 km || 
|-id=237 bgcolor=#d6d6d6
| 523237 ||  || — || January 29, 2012 || Kitt Peak || Spacewatch ||  || align=right | 2.8 km || 
|-id=238 bgcolor=#d6d6d6
| 523238 ||  || — || October 7, 2004 || Kitt Peak || Spacewatch ||  || align=right | 2.7 km || 
|-id=239 bgcolor=#E9E9E9
| 523239 ||  || — || March 16, 2009 || Mount Lemmon || Mount Lemmon Survey ||  || align=right data-sort-value="0.87" | 870 m || 
|-id=240 bgcolor=#E9E9E9
| 523240 ||  || — || February 26, 2008 || Mount Lemmon || Mount Lemmon Survey ||  || align=right | 1.8 km || 
|-id=241 bgcolor=#E9E9E9
| 523241 ||  || — || June 5, 2014 || Haleakala || Pan-STARRS ||  || align=right | 1.1 km || 
|-id=242 bgcolor=#E9E9E9
| 523242 ||  || — || June 7, 2014 || Haleakala || Pan-STARRS ||  || align=right | 1.3 km || 
|-id=243 bgcolor=#fefefe
| 523243 ||  || — || April 23, 2014 || Haleakala || Pan-STARRS ||  || align=right | 1.0 km || 
|-id=244 bgcolor=#d6d6d6
| 523244 ||  || — || January 22, 2012 || Haleakala || Pan-STARRS ||  || align=right | 3.1 km || 
|-id=245 bgcolor=#E9E9E9
| 523245 ||  || — || March 26, 2009 || Kitt Peak || Spacewatch ||  || align=right | 1.8 km || 
|-id=246 bgcolor=#E9E9E9
| 523246 ||  || — || October 20, 2015 || XuYi || PMO NEO ||  || align=right | 2.0 km || 
|-id=247 bgcolor=#E9E9E9
| 523247 ||  || — || May 7, 2014 || Haleakala || Pan-STARRS ||  || align=right | 1.3 km || 
|-id=248 bgcolor=#d6d6d6
| 523248 ||  || — || August 20, 2014 || Haleakala || Pan-STARRS ||  || align=right | 2.1 km || 
|-id=249 bgcolor=#d6d6d6
| 523249 ||  || — || March 12, 2007 || Kitt Peak || Spacewatch ||  || align=right | 2.3 km || 
|-id=250 bgcolor=#d6d6d6
| 523250 ||  || — || September 30, 2009 || Mount Lemmon || Mount Lemmon Survey ||  || align=right | 3.6 km || 
|-id=251 bgcolor=#d6d6d6
| 523251 ||  || — || September 21, 2009 || Catalina || CSS ||  || align=right | 3.1 km || 
|-id=252 bgcolor=#d6d6d6
| 523252 ||  || — || October 24, 2009 || Kitt Peak || Spacewatch ||  || align=right | 2.8 km || 
|-id=253 bgcolor=#d6d6d6
| 523253 ||  || — || January 5, 2006 || Kitt Peak || Spacewatch ||  || align=right | 2.5 km || 
|-id=254 bgcolor=#d6d6d6
| 523254 ||  || — || July 1, 2014 || Haleakala || Pan-STARRS ||  || align=right | 2.6 km || 
|-id=255 bgcolor=#E9E9E9
| 523255 ||  || — || December 20, 2007 || Kitt Peak || Spacewatch ||  || align=right | 1.4 km || 
|-id=256 bgcolor=#E9E9E9
| 523256 ||  || — || October 20, 1995 || Kitt Peak || Spacewatch ||  || align=right data-sort-value="0.80" | 800 m || 
|-id=257 bgcolor=#d6d6d6
| 523257 ||  || — || October 26, 2009 || Kitt Peak || Spacewatch ||  || align=right | 2.3 km || 
|-id=258 bgcolor=#E9E9E9
| 523258 ||  || — || March 31, 2008 || Mount Lemmon || Mount Lemmon Survey ||  || align=right | 2.0 km || 
|-id=259 bgcolor=#d6d6d6
| 523259 ||  || — || April 16, 2012 || Haleakala || Pan-STARRS ||  || align=right | 2.6 km || 
|-id=260 bgcolor=#E9E9E9
| 523260 ||  || — || April 1, 2013 || Mount Lemmon || Mount Lemmon Survey ||  || align=right | 1.3 km || 
|-id=261 bgcolor=#E9E9E9
| 523261 ||  || — || January 18, 2012 || Mount Lemmon || Mount Lemmon Survey ||  || align=right | 1.9 km || 
|-id=262 bgcolor=#E9E9E9
| 523262 ||  || — || January 15, 2008 || Mount Lemmon || Mount Lemmon Survey ||  || align=right | 1.9 km || 
|-id=263 bgcolor=#d6d6d6
| 523263 ||  || — || January 25, 2006 || Kitt Peak || Spacewatch ||  || align=right | 2.8 km || 
|-id=264 bgcolor=#d6d6d6
| 523264 ||  || — || January 20, 2012 || Kitt Peak || Spacewatch ||  || align=right | 2.1 km || 
|-id=265 bgcolor=#E9E9E9
| 523265 ||  || — || September 30, 2010 || Mount Lemmon || Mount Lemmon Survey ||  || align=right | 2.4 km || 
|-id=266 bgcolor=#fefefe
| 523266 ||  || — || November 25, 2005 || Kitt Peak || Spacewatch ||  || align=right data-sort-value="0.65" | 650 m || 
|-id=267 bgcolor=#E9E9E9
| 523267 ||  || — || June 4, 2014 || Haleakala || Pan-STARRS ||  || align=right | 1.2 km || 
|-id=268 bgcolor=#d6d6d6
| 523268 ||  || — || February 20, 2012 || Haleakala || Pan-STARRS ||  || align=right | 2.6 km || 
|-id=269 bgcolor=#d6d6d6
| 523269 ||  || — || December 14, 2010 || Mount Lemmon || Mount Lemmon Survey ||  || align=right | 3.0 km || 
|-id=270 bgcolor=#E9E9E9
| 523270 ||  || — || May 8, 2013 || Haleakala || Pan-STARRS ||  || align=right | 1.1 km || 
|-id=271 bgcolor=#E9E9E9
| 523271 ||  || — || September 3, 2014 || Mount Lemmon || Mount Lemmon Survey ||  || align=right | 1.6 km || 
|-id=272 bgcolor=#E9E9E9
| 523272 ||  || — || November 9, 2007 || Kitt Peak || Spacewatch ||  || align=right data-sort-value="0.99" | 990 m || 
|-id=273 bgcolor=#E9E9E9
| 523273 ||  || — || September 2, 2010 || Mount Lemmon || Mount Lemmon Survey ||  || align=right | 1.4 km || 
|-id=274 bgcolor=#E9E9E9
| 523274 ||  || — || March 13, 2013 || Mount Lemmon || Mount Lemmon Survey ||  || align=right | 1.7 km || 
|-id=275 bgcolor=#E9E9E9
| 523275 ||  || — || October 31, 2011 || Kitt Peak || Spacewatch ||  || align=right | 2.0 km || 
|-id=276 bgcolor=#d6d6d6
| 523276 ||  || — || December 30, 2005 || Mount Lemmon || Mount Lemmon Survey ||  || align=right | 3.5 km || 
|-id=277 bgcolor=#d6d6d6
| 523277 ||  || — || January 8, 2006 || Kitt Peak || Spacewatch ||  || align=right | 2.4 km || 
|-id=278 bgcolor=#d6d6d6
| 523278 ||  || — || September 26, 2009 || Kitt Peak || Spacewatch ||  || align=right | 2.9 km || 
|-id=279 bgcolor=#d6d6d6
| 523279 ||  || — || January 9, 2006 || Kitt Peak || Spacewatch ||  || align=right | 1.9 km || 
|-id=280 bgcolor=#d6d6d6
| 523280 ||  || — || August 22, 2014 || Haleakala || Pan-STARRS ||  || align=right | 3.7 km || 
|-id=281 bgcolor=#fefefe
| 523281 ||  || — || January 3, 2013 || Mount Lemmon || Mount Lemmon Survey ||  || align=right data-sort-value="0.86" | 860 m || 
|-id=282 bgcolor=#E9E9E9
| 523282 ||  || — || October 13, 2007 || Mount Lemmon || Mount Lemmon Survey ||  || align=right | 1.1 km || 
|-id=283 bgcolor=#E9E9E9
| 523283 ||  || — || May 31, 2014 || Haleakala || Pan-STARRS ||  || align=right | 2.0 km || 
|-id=284 bgcolor=#d6d6d6
| 523284 ||  || — || March 25, 2012 || Mount Lemmon || Mount Lemmon Survey ||  || align=right | 2.7 km || 
|-id=285 bgcolor=#E9E9E9
| 523285 ||  || — || January 20, 2008 || Kitt Peak || Spacewatch ||  || align=right | 2.0 km || 
|-id=286 bgcolor=#E9E9E9
| 523286 ||  || — || December 19, 2007 || Mount Lemmon || Mount Lemmon Survey ||  || align=right | 1.5 km || 
|-id=287 bgcolor=#fefefe
| 523287 ||  || — || March 24, 2014 || Haleakala || Pan-STARRS ||  || align=right data-sort-value="0.86" | 860 m || 
|-id=288 bgcolor=#d6d6d6
| 523288 ||  || — || October 12, 2015 || Haleakala || Pan-STARRS ||  || align=right | 2.6 km || 
|-id=289 bgcolor=#d6d6d6
| 523289 ||  || — || January 8, 2006 || Kitt Peak || Spacewatch ||  || align=right | 2.7 km || 
|-id=290 bgcolor=#E9E9E9
| 523290 ||  || — || November 3, 2011 || Mount Lemmon || Mount Lemmon Survey ||  || align=right | 1.3 km || 
|-id=291 bgcolor=#d6d6d6
| 523291 ||  || — || October 11, 2010 || Mount Lemmon || Mount Lemmon Survey ||  || align=right | 2.3 km || 
|-id=292 bgcolor=#E9E9E9
| 523292 ||  || — || October 10, 2007 || Mount Lemmon || Mount Lemmon Survey ||  || align=right data-sort-value="0.98" | 980 m || 
|-id=293 bgcolor=#E9E9E9
| 523293 ||  || — || October 26, 2011 || Haleakala || Pan-STARRS ||  || align=right | 1.6 km || 
|-id=294 bgcolor=#d6d6d6
| 523294 ||  || — || June 14, 2004 || Kitt Peak || Spacewatch ||  || align=right | 2.7 km || 
|-id=295 bgcolor=#E9E9E9
| 523295 ||  || — || July 12, 2005 || Kitt Peak || Spacewatch ||  || align=right | 2.0 km || 
|-id=296 bgcolor=#d6d6d6
| 523296 ||  || — || November 26, 2005 || Kitt Peak || Spacewatch ||  || align=right | 2.5 km || 
|-id=297 bgcolor=#d6d6d6
| 523297 ||  || — || December 9, 2010 || Mount Lemmon || Mount Lemmon Survey ||  || align=right | 3.5 km || 
|-id=298 bgcolor=#d6d6d6
| 523298 ||  || — || September 30, 2009 || Mount Lemmon || Mount Lemmon Survey ||  || align=right | 3.5 km || 
|-id=299 bgcolor=#d6d6d6
| 523299 ||  || — || March 8, 2008 || Kitt Peak || Spacewatch ||  || align=right | 2.4 km || 
|-id=300 bgcolor=#E9E9E9
| 523300 ||  || — || October 19, 2006 || Mount Lemmon || Mount Lemmon Survey ||  || align=right | 2.3 km || 
|}

523301–523400 

|-bgcolor=#d6d6d6
| 523301 ||  || — || April 20, 2007 || Kitt Peak || Spacewatch ||  || align=right | 2.9 km || 
|-id=302 bgcolor=#E9E9E9
| 523302 ||  || — || February 21, 2009 || Catalina || CSS ||  || align=right | 1.4 km || 
|-id=303 bgcolor=#fefefe
| 523303 ||  || — || December 8, 2012 || Mount Lemmon || Mount Lemmon Survey ||  || align=right data-sort-value="0.98" | 980 m || 
|-id=304 bgcolor=#E9E9E9
| 523304 ||  || — || December 19, 2003 || Kitt Peak || Spacewatch ||  || align=right | 1.9 km || 
|-id=305 bgcolor=#fefefe
| 523305 ||  || — || June 20, 2015 || Haleakala || Pan-STARRS ||  || align=right data-sort-value="0.83" | 830 m || 
|-id=306 bgcolor=#E9E9E9
| 523306 ||  || — || May 7, 2014 || Haleakala || Pan-STARRS ||  || align=right data-sort-value="0.89" | 890 m || 
|-id=307 bgcolor=#d6d6d6
| 523307 ||  || — || September 29, 2009 || Mount Lemmon || Mount Lemmon Survey ||  || align=right | 3.5 km || 
|-id=308 bgcolor=#d6d6d6
| 523308 ||  || — || December 27, 2005 || Mount Lemmon || Mount Lemmon Survey ||  || align=right | 2.5 km || 
|-id=309 bgcolor=#d6d6d6
| 523309 ||  || — || March 16, 2012 || Kitt Peak || Spacewatch ||  || align=right | 3.0 km || 
|-id=310 bgcolor=#d6d6d6
| 523310 ||  || — || December 9, 2004 || Kitt Peak || Spacewatch ||  || align=right | 3.5 km || 
|-id=311 bgcolor=#d6d6d6
| 523311 ||  || — || August 28, 2014 || Haleakala || Pan-STARRS ||  || align=right | 3.1 km || 
|-id=312 bgcolor=#d6d6d6
| 523312 ||  || — || July 29, 2014 || Haleakala || Pan-STARRS || EOS || align=right | 2.0 km || 
|-id=313 bgcolor=#E9E9E9
| 523313 ||  || — || February 14, 2013 || Haleakala || Pan-STARRS ||  || align=right | 1.00 km || 
|-id=314 bgcolor=#E9E9E9
| 523314 ||  || — || October 27, 2006 || Mount Lemmon || Mount Lemmon Survey ||  || align=right | 1.9 km || 
|-id=315 bgcolor=#d6d6d6
| 523315 ||  || — || February 2, 2006 || Kitt Peak || Spacewatch ||  || align=right | 2.5 km || 
|-id=316 bgcolor=#E9E9E9
| 523316 ||  || — || March 12, 2013 || Kitt Peak || Spacewatch ||  || align=right | 1.4 km || 
|-id=317 bgcolor=#d6d6d6
| 523317 ||  || — || August 20, 2014 || Haleakala || Pan-STARRS ||  || align=right | 2.3 km || 
|-id=318 bgcolor=#d6d6d6
| 523318 ||  || — || July 13, 2013 || Mount Lemmon || Mount Lemmon Survey ||  || align=right | 2.7 km || 
|-id=319 bgcolor=#d6d6d6
| 523319 ||  || — || October 14, 2009 || Mount Lemmon || Mount Lemmon Survey ||  || align=right | 3.0 km || 
|-id=320 bgcolor=#E9E9E9
| 523320 ||  || — || November 30, 2011 || Mount Lemmon || Mount Lemmon Survey ||  || align=right | 1.6 km || 
|-id=321 bgcolor=#E9E9E9
| 523321 ||  || — || September 17, 2006 || Kitt Peak || Spacewatch ||  || align=right | 1.5 km || 
|-id=322 bgcolor=#E9E9E9
| 523322 ||  || — || August 31, 2005 || Kitt Peak || Spacewatch ||  || align=right | 2.4 km || 
|-id=323 bgcolor=#d6d6d6
| 523323 ||  || — || November 30, 2010 || Mount Lemmon || Mount Lemmon Survey ||  || align=right | 2.5 km || 
|-id=324 bgcolor=#d6d6d6
| 523324 ||  || — || May 31, 2014 || Haleakala || Pan-STARRS ||  || align=right | 3.0 km || 
|-id=325 bgcolor=#d6d6d6
| 523325 ||  || — || January 28, 2006 || Mount Lemmon || Mount Lemmon Survey ||  || align=right | 3.1 km || 
|-id=326 bgcolor=#E9E9E9
| 523326 ||  || — || April 13, 2013 || Haleakala || Pan-STARRS ||  || align=right | 1.2 km || 
|-id=327 bgcolor=#d6d6d6
| 523327 ||  || — || December 1, 2010 || Kitt Peak || Spacewatch ||  || align=right | 2.7 km || 
|-id=328 bgcolor=#fefefe
| 523328 ||  || — || September 6, 2008 || Mount Lemmon || Mount Lemmon Survey ||  || align=right data-sort-value="0.60" | 600 m || 
|-id=329 bgcolor=#E9E9E9
| 523329 ||  || — || September 16, 2010 || Kitt Peak || Spacewatch ||  || align=right | 1.6 km || 
|-id=330 bgcolor=#d6d6d6
| 523330 ||  || — || March 26, 2007 || Kitt Peak || Spacewatch ||  || align=right | 2.0 km || 
|-id=331 bgcolor=#E9E9E9
| 523331 ||  || — || October 2, 2010 || Mount Lemmon || Mount Lemmon Survey ||  || align=right | 2.3 km || 
|-id=332 bgcolor=#d6d6d6
| 523332 ||  || — || November 1, 2010 || Kitt Peak || Spacewatch ||  || align=right | 1.8 km || 
|-id=333 bgcolor=#fefefe
| 523333 ||  || — || January 5, 2006 || Mount Lemmon || Mount Lemmon Survey ||  || align=right data-sort-value="0.90" | 900 m || 
|-id=334 bgcolor=#d6d6d6
| 523334 ||  || — || February 8, 2011 || Mount Lemmon || Mount Lemmon Survey ||  || align=right | 2.8 km || 
|-id=335 bgcolor=#E9E9E9
| 523335 ||  || — || September 11, 2005 || Kitt Peak || Spacewatch ||  || align=right | 1.9 km || 
|-id=336 bgcolor=#E9E9E9
| 523336 ||  || — || January 11, 2008 || Mount Lemmon || Mount Lemmon Survey ||  || align=right | 1.1 km || 
|-id=337 bgcolor=#d6d6d6
| 523337 ||  || — || September 5, 2008 || Kitt Peak || Spacewatch ||  || align=right | 2.8 km || 
|-id=338 bgcolor=#d6d6d6
| 523338 ||  || — || December 2, 2010 || Kitt Peak || Spacewatch ||  || align=right | 2.9 km || 
|-id=339 bgcolor=#fefefe
| 523339 ||  || — || January 17, 2005 || Kitt Peak || Spacewatch ||  || align=right data-sort-value="0.94" | 940 m || 
|-id=340 bgcolor=#E9E9E9
| 523340 ||  || — || November 8, 2007 || Kitt Peak || Spacewatch ||  || align=right | 1.3 km || 
|-id=341 bgcolor=#d6d6d6
| 523341 ||  || — || October 30, 2009 || Mount Lemmon || Mount Lemmon Survey ||  || align=right | 2.9 km || 
|-id=342 bgcolor=#E9E9E9
| 523342 ||  || — || September 11, 2010 || Mount Lemmon || Mount Lemmon Survey ||  || align=right | 1.9 km || 
|-id=343 bgcolor=#E9E9E9
| 523343 ||  || — || March 9, 2008 || Kitt Peak || Spacewatch ||  || align=right | 1.8 km || 
|-id=344 bgcolor=#E9E9E9
| 523344 ||  || — || October 6, 2005 || Kitt Peak || Spacewatch ||  || align=right | 2.2 km || 
|-id=345 bgcolor=#E9E9E9
| 523345 ||  || — || January 24, 2012 || Haleakala || Pan-STARRS ||  || align=right | 2.3 km || 
|-id=346 bgcolor=#fefefe
| 523346 ||  || — || October 9, 2015 || Haleakala || Pan-STARRS ||  || align=right data-sort-value="0.82" | 820 m || 
|-id=347 bgcolor=#d6d6d6
| 523347 ||  || — || February 9, 2005 || Mount Lemmon || Mount Lemmon Survey ||  || align=right | 3.4 km || 
|-id=348 bgcolor=#E9E9E9
| 523348 ||  || — || November 10, 2010 || Mount Lemmon || Mount Lemmon Survey ||  || align=right | 1.5 km || 
|-id=349 bgcolor=#d6d6d6
| 523349 ||  || — || January 19, 2005 || Kitt Peak || Spacewatch ||  || align=right | 3.1 km || 
|-id=350 bgcolor=#d6d6d6
| 523350 ||  || — || March 15, 2012 || Kitt Peak || Spacewatch ||  || align=right | 2.8 km || 
|-id=351 bgcolor=#d6d6d6
| 523351 ||  || — || January 30, 2011 || Haleakala || Pan-STARRS ||  || align=right | 3.3 km || 
|-id=352 bgcolor=#d6d6d6
| 523352 ||  || — || November 1, 2010 || Mount Lemmon || Mount Lemmon Survey ||  || align=right | 2.7 km || 
|-id=353 bgcolor=#E9E9E9
| 523353 ||  || — || February 12, 2008 || Mount Lemmon || Mount Lemmon Survey ||  || align=right | 2.3 km || 
|-id=354 bgcolor=#E9E9E9
| 523354 ||  || — || September 27, 2012 || Haleakala || Pan-STARRS ||  || align=right | 1.3 km || 
|-id=355 bgcolor=#E9E9E9
| 523355 ||  || — || October 11, 2010 || Mount Lemmon || Mount Lemmon Survey ||  || align=right | 1.9 km || 
|-id=356 bgcolor=#d6d6d6
| 523356 ||  || — || December 14, 2010 || Mount Lemmon || Mount Lemmon Survey ||  || align=right | 3.2 km || 
|-id=357 bgcolor=#d6d6d6
| 523357 ||  || — || December 8, 2015 || Haleakala || Pan-STARRS ||  || align=right | 2.8 km || 
|-id=358 bgcolor=#d6d6d6
| 523358 ||  || — || July 31, 2014 || Haleakala || Pan-STARRS ||  || align=right | 2.6 km || 
|-id=359 bgcolor=#d6d6d6
| 523359 ||  || — || October 21, 2015 || Haleakala || Pan-STARRS ||  || align=right | 2.6 km || 
|-id=360 bgcolor=#E9E9E9
| 523360 ||  || — || October 9, 2015 || Haleakala || Pan-STARRS ||  || align=right | 1.2 km || 
|-id=361 bgcolor=#E9E9E9
| 523361 ||  || — || January 30, 2004 || Kitt Peak || Spacewatch ||  || align=right | 2.5 km || 
|-id=362 bgcolor=#E9E9E9
| 523362 ||  || — || September 19, 2006 || Kitt Peak || Spacewatch ||  || align=right | 1.8 km || 
|-id=363 bgcolor=#E9E9E9
| 523363 ||  || — || February 12, 2008 || Kitt Peak || Spacewatch ||  || align=right | 2.5 km || 
|-id=364 bgcolor=#E9E9E9
| 523364 ||  || — || September 25, 2011 || Haleakala || Pan-STARRS ||  || align=right data-sort-value="0.83" | 830 m || 
|-id=365 bgcolor=#d6d6d6
| 523365 ||  || — || February 13, 2010 || WISE || WISE ||  || align=right | 5.1 km || 
|-id=366 bgcolor=#d6d6d6
| 523366 ||  || — || October 22, 2009 || Mount Lemmon || Mount Lemmon Survey ||  || align=right | 2.6 km || 
|-id=367 bgcolor=#d6d6d6
| 523367 ||  || — || April 25, 2007 || Kitt Peak || Spacewatch ||  || align=right | 2.6 km || 
|-id=368 bgcolor=#E9E9E9
| 523368 ||  || — || October 25, 2005 || Mount Lemmon || Mount Lemmon Survey ||  || align=right | 2.4 km || 
|-id=369 bgcolor=#E9E9E9
| 523369 ||  || — || January 25, 2007 || Kitt Peak || Spacewatch ||  || align=right | 2.3 km || 
|-id=370 bgcolor=#fefefe
| 523370 ||  || — || September 20, 2011 || Kitt Peak || Spacewatch ||  || align=right data-sort-value="0.86" | 860 m || 
|-id=371 bgcolor=#d6d6d6
| 523371 ||  || — || January 7, 2006 || Kitt Peak || Spacewatch ||  || align=right | 2.5 km || 
|-id=372 bgcolor=#E9E9E9
| 523372 ||  || — || January 19, 2012 || Kitt Peak || Spacewatch ||  || align=right | 2.1 km || 
|-id=373 bgcolor=#d6d6d6
| 523373 ||  || — || October 21, 2009 || Mount Lemmon || Mount Lemmon Survey ||  || align=right | 3.2 km || 
|-id=374 bgcolor=#d6d6d6
| 523374 ||  || — || September 18, 2014 || Haleakala || Pan-STARRS ||  || align=right | 2.5 km || 
|-id=375 bgcolor=#E9E9E9
| 523375 ||  || — || November 25, 2011 || Haleakala || Pan-STARRS ||  || align=right data-sort-value="0.89" | 890 m || 
|-id=376 bgcolor=#d6d6d6
| 523376 ||  || — || November 21, 2005 || Kitt Peak || Spacewatch ||  || align=right | 1.9 km || 
|-id=377 bgcolor=#d6d6d6
| 523377 ||  || — || January 30, 2012 || Kitt Peak || Spacewatch ||  || align=right | 2.7 km || 
|-id=378 bgcolor=#d6d6d6
| 523378 ||  || — || January 21, 2012 || Kitt Peak || Spacewatch ||  || align=right | 2.6 km || 
|-id=379 bgcolor=#E9E9E9
| 523379 ||  || — || January 13, 2008 || Mount Lemmon || Mount Lemmon Survey ||  || align=right | 1.8 km || 
|-id=380 bgcolor=#E9E9E9
| 523380 ||  || — || October 18, 2006 || Kitt Peak || Spacewatch ||  || align=right | 2.3 km || 
|-id=381 bgcolor=#d6d6d6
| 523381 ||  || — || September 2, 2014 || Haleakala || Pan-STARRS ||  || align=right | 2.7 km || 
|-id=382 bgcolor=#d6d6d6
| 523382 ||  || — || April 8, 2002 || Kitt Peak || Spacewatch ||  || align=right | 2.2 km || 
|-id=383 bgcolor=#E9E9E9
| 523383 ||  || — || March 19, 2013 || Haleakala || Pan-STARRS ||  || align=right | 1.7 km || 
|-id=384 bgcolor=#E9E9E9
| 523384 ||  || — || December 31, 2007 || Kitt Peak || Spacewatch ||  || align=right | 1.4 km || 
|-id=385 bgcolor=#E9E9E9
| 523385 ||  || — || August 29, 2005 || Kitt Peak || Spacewatch ||  || align=right | 2.1 km || 
|-id=386 bgcolor=#d6d6d6
| 523386 ||  || — || September 17, 2014 || Haleakala || Pan-STARRS ||  || align=right | 3.1 km || 
|-id=387 bgcolor=#d6d6d6
| 523387 ||  || — || January 9, 2006 || Kitt Peak || Spacewatch ||  || align=right | 2.8 km || 
|-id=388 bgcolor=#d6d6d6
| 523388 ||  || — || September 25, 2009 || Kitt Peak || Spacewatch ||  || align=right | 2.8 km || 
|-id=389 bgcolor=#d6d6d6
| 523389 ||  || — || January 24, 2011 || Kitt Peak || Spacewatch ||  || align=right | 3.1 km || 
|-id=390 bgcolor=#d6d6d6
| 523390 ||  || — || May 10, 2007 || Anderson Mesa || LONEOS ||  || align=right | 3.7 km || 
|-id=391 bgcolor=#d6d6d6
| 523391 ||  || — || April 20, 2007 || Kitt Peak || Spacewatch ||  || align=right | 2.9 km || 
|-id=392 bgcolor=#d6d6d6
| 523392 ||  || — || January 4, 2011 || Mount Lemmon || Mount Lemmon Survey ||  || align=right | 3.1 km || 
|-id=393 bgcolor=#d6d6d6
| 523393 ||  || — || January 27, 2011 || Mount Lemmon || Mount Lemmon Survey ||  || align=right | 2.5 km || 
|-id=394 bgcolor=#d6d6d6
| 523394 ||  || — || October 14, 2009 || Mount Lemmon || Mount Lemmon Survey ||  || align=right | 3.4 km || 
|-id=395 bgcolor=#E9E9E9
| 523395 ||  || — || May 11, 2005 || Mount Lemmon || Mount Lemmon Survey ||  || align=right | 1.3 km || 
|-id=396 bgcolor=#d6d6d6
| 523396 ||  || — || March 4, 2006 || Kitt Peak || Spacewatch ||  || align=right | 3.9 km || 
|-id=397 bgcolor=#d6d6d6
| 523397 ||  || — || April 23, 2007 || Mount Lemmon || Mount Lemmon Survey ||  || align=right | 2.8 km || 
|-id=398 bgcolor=#d6d6d6
| 523398 ||  || — || February 5, 2000 || Kitt Peak || Spacewatch ||  || align=right | 3.1 km || 
|-id=399 bgcolor=#E9E9E9
| 523399 ||  || — || February 3, 2012 || Haleakala || Pan-STARRS ||  || align=right | 2.4 km || 
|-id=400 bgcolor=#d6d6d6
| 523400 ||  || — || September 18, 2014 || Haleakala || Pan-STARRS ||  || align=right | 3.3 km || 
|}

523401–523500 

|-bgcolor=#d6d6d6
| 523401 ||  || — || October 9, 2004 || Kitt Peak || Spacewatch || LIX || align=right | 3.4 km || 
|-id=402 bgcolor=#d6d6d6
| 523402 ||  || — || April 10, 2002 || Socorro || LINEAR ||  || align=right | 3.4 km || 
|-id=403 bgcolor=#d6d6d6
| 523403 ||  || — || September 19, 2003 || Kitt Peak || Spacewatch ||  || align=right | 3.3 km || 
|-id=404 bgcolor=#E9E9E9
| 523404 ||  || — || March 4, 2013 || Haleakala || Pan-STARRS ||  || align=right | 2.1 km || 
|-id=405 bgcolor=#d6d6d6
| 523405 ||  || — || July 18, 2010 || WISE || WISE ||  || align=right | 3.6 km || 
|-id=406 bgcolor=#E9E9E9
| 523406 ||  || — || September 4, 2010 || Mount Lemmon || Mount Lemmon Survey ||  || align=right | 1.7 km || 
|-id=407 bgcolor=#d6d6d6
| 523407 ||  || — || March 17, 2012 || Mount Lemmon || Mount Lemmon Survey ||  || align=right | 3.5 km || 
|-id=408 bgcolor=#d6d6d6
| 523408 ||  || — || June 28, 2014 || Kitt Peak || Spacewatch ||  || align=right | 2.1 km || 
|-id=409 bgcolor=#d6d6d6
| 523409 ||  || — || March 24, 2012 || Kitt Peak || Spacewatch ||  || align=right | 2.5 km || 
|-id=410 bgcolor=#d6d6d6
| 523410 ||  || — || March 14, 2007 || Kitt Peak || Spacewatch ||  || align=right | 2.3 km || 
|-id=411 bgcolor=#E9E9E9
| 523411 ||  || — || February 3, 2012 || Haleakala || Pan-STARRS ||  || align=right | 1.9 km || 
|-id=412 bgcolor=#d6d6d6
| 523412 ||  || — || September 2, 2008 || Kitt Peak || Spacewatch ||  || align=right | 2.8 km || 
|-id=413 bgcolor=#d6d6d6
| 523413 ||  || — || August 23, 2014 || Haleakala || Pan-STARRS ||  || align=right | 2.9 km || 
|-id=414 bgcolor=#d6d6d6
| 523414 ||  || — || September 20, 2014 || Catalina || CSS ||  || align=right | 3.0 km || 
|-id=415 bgcolor=#E9E9E9
| 523415 ||  || — || February 4, 2012 || Haleakala || Pan-STARRS ||  || align=right | 2.1 km || 
|-id=416 bgcolor=#d6d6d6
| 523416 ||  || — || October 16, 2003 || Kitt Peak || Spacewatch ||  || align=right | 2.9 km || 
|-id=417 bgcolor=#fefefe
| 523417 ||  || — || October 25, 2011 || Haleakala || Pan-STARRS ||  || align=right | 1.1 km || 
|-id=418 bgcolor=#d6d6d6
| 523418 ||  || — || November 30, 2005 || Kitt Peak || Spacewatch ||  || align=right | 3.3 km || 
|-id=419 bgcolor=#d6d6d6
| 523419 ||  || — || April 26, 2000 || Kitt Peak || Spacewatch ||  || align=right | 2.9 km || 
|-id=420 bgcolor=#d6d6d6
| 523420 ||  || — || September 18, 2003 || Kitt Peak || Spacewatch ||  || align=right | 3.2 km || 
|-id=421 bgcolor=#E9E9E9
| 523421 ||  || — || November 18, 2011 || Mount Lemmon || Mount Lemmon Survey ||  || align=right | 1.3 km || 
|-id=422 bgcolor=#d6d6d6
| 523422 ||  || — || September 15, 2009 || Kitt Peak || Spacewatch ||  || align=right | 3.5 km || 
|-id=423 bgcolor=#d6d6d6
| 523423 ||  || — || December 10, 2004 || Kitt Peak || Spacewatch ||  || align=right | 4.4 km || 
|-id=424 bgcolor=#d6d6d6
| 523424 ||  || — || January 31, 2006 || Kitt Peak || Spacewatch ||  || align=right | 2.8 km || 
|-id=425 bgcolor=#d6d6d6
| 523425 ||  || — || July 1, 2008 || Kitt Peak || Spacewatch ||  || align=right | 3.9 km || 
|-id=426 bgcolor=#d6d6d6
| 523426 ||  || — || January 26, 2011 || Kitt Peak || Spacewatch ||  || align=right | 3.2 km || 
|-id=427 bgcolor=#d6d6d6
| 523427 ||  || — || January 8, 2011 || Mount Lemmon || Mount Lemmon Survey ||  || align=right | 3.2 km || 
|-id=428 bgcolor=#E9E9E9
| 523428 ||  || — || April 10, 2013 || Haleakala || Pan-STARRS ||  || align=right | 1.6 km || 
|-id=429 bgcolor=#d6d6d6
| 523429 ||  || — || October 28, 2014 || Haleakala || Pan-STARRS ||  || align=right | 3.5 km || 
|-id=430 bgcolor=#d6d6d6
| 523430 ||  || — || March 26, 2007 || Kitt Peak || Spacewatch ||  || align=right | 2.2 km || 
|-id=431 bgcolor=#fefefe
| 523431 ||  || — || October 19, 2011 || Kitt Peak || Spacewatch ||  || align=right data-sort-value="0.86" | 860 m || 
|-id=432 bgcolor=#E9E9E9
| 523432 ||  || — || November 30, 2011 || Kitt Peak || Spacewatch ||  || align=right | 1.7 km || 
|-id=433 bgcolor=#E9E9E9
| 523433 ||  || — || April 13, 2008 || Mount Lemmon || Mount Lemmon Survey ||  || align=right | 2.6 km || 
|-id=434 bgcolor=#E9E9E9
| 523434 ||  || — || January 27, 2007 || Kitt Peak || Spacewatch ||  || align=right | 2.0 km || 
|-id=435 bgcolor=#E9E9E9
| 523435 ||  || — || July 14, 2013 || Haleakala || Pan-STARRS ||  || align=right | 1.7 km || 
|-id=436 bgcolor=#E9E9E9
| 523436 ||  || — || April 28, 2008 || Kitt Peak || Spacewatch ||  || align=right | 2.1 km || 
|-id=437 bgcolor=#d6d6d6
| 523437 ||  || — || February 26, 2011 || Mount Lemmon || Mount Lemmon Survey ||  || align=right | 2.5 km || 
|-id=438 bgcolor=#d6d6d6
| 523438 ||  || — || January 30, 2011 || Haleakala || Pan-STARRS ||  || align=right | 2.8 km || 
|-id=439 bgcolor=#E9E9E9
| 523439 ||  || — || November 8, 2010 || Kitt Peak || Spacewatch ||  || align=right | 1.9 km || 
|-id=440 bgcolor=#E9E9E9
| 523440 ||  || — || April 29, 2003 || Kitt Peak || Spacewatch ||  || align=right | 2.1 km || 
|-id=441 bgcolor=#d6d6d6
| 523441 ||  || — || September 21, 2009 || Mount Lemmon || Mount Lemmon Survey ||  || align=right | 2.4 km || 
|-id=442 bgcolor=#d6d6d6
| 523442 ||  || — || December 14, 2010 || Mount Lemmon || Mount Lemmon Survey ||  || align=right | 1.9 km || 
|-id=443 bgcolor=#E9E9E9
| 523443 ||  || — || January 30, 2012 || Kitt Peak || Spacewatch ||  || align=right | 1.8 km || 
|-id=444 bgcolor=#d6d6d6
| 523444 ||  || — || January 30, 2011 || Haleakala || Pan-STARRS ||  || align=right | 3.5 km || 
|-id=445 bgcolor=#d6d6d6
| 523445 ||  || — || March 16, 2007 || Mount Lemmon || Mount Lemmon Survey ||  || align=right | 2.2 km || 
|-id=446 bgcolor=#d6d6d6
| 523446 ||  || — || September 7, 2008 || Mount Lemmon || Mount Lemmon Survey ||  || align=right | 2.8 km || 
|-id=447 bgcolor=#d6d6d6
| 523447 ||  || — || February 23, 2012 || Mount Lemmon || Mount Lemmon Survey ||  || align=right | 1.8 km || 
|-id=448 bgcolor=#E9E9E9
| 523448 ||  || — || August 29, 2006 || Kitt Peak || Spacewatch ||  || align=right data-sort-value="0.77" | 770 m || 
|-id=449 bgcolor=#d6d6d6
| 523449 ||  || — || August 3, 2011 || Haleakala || Pan-STARRS || 3:2 || align=right | 4.4 km || 
|-id=450 bgcolor=#d6d6d6
| 523450 ||  || — || March 26, 2010 || WISE || WISE ||  || align=right | 3.5 km || 
|-id=451 bgcolor=#E9E9E9
| 523451 ||  || — || May 8, 2013 || Haleakala || Pan-STARRS ||  || align=right | 1.8 km || 
|-id=452 bgcolor=#E9E9E9
| 523452 ||  || — || November 2, 2007 || Kitt Peak || Spacewatch ||  || align=right data-sort-value="0.88" | 880 m || 
|-id=453 bgcolor=#d6d6d6
| 523453 ||  || — || February 10, 2010 || WISE || WISE ||  || align=right | 3.9 km || 
|-id=454 bgcolor=#d6d6d6
| 523454 ||  || — || September 29, 2009 || Mount Lemmon || Mount Lemmon Survey ||  || align=right | 2.8 km || 
|-id=455 bgcolor=#d6d6d6
| 523455 ||  || — || May 12, 2013 || Mount Lemmon || Mount Lemmon Survey ||  || align=right | 3.3 km || 
|-id=456 bgcolor=#d6d6d6
| 523456 ||  || — || February 7, 2010 || WISE || WISE ||  || align=right | 5.8 km || 
|-id=457 bgcolor=#d6d6d6
| 523457 ||  || — || January 30, 2010 || WISE || WISE ||  || align=right | 3.7 km || 
|-id=458 bgcolor=#d6d6d6
| 523458 ||  || — || May 18, 2012 || Haleakala || Pan-STARRS ||  || align=right | 2.7 km || 
|-id=459 bgcolor=#d6d6d6
| 523459 ||  || — || September 7, 2008 || Catalina || CSS ||  || align=right | 4.6 km || 
|-id=460 bgcolor=#d6d6d6
| 523460 ||  || — || October 24, 2009 || Mount Lemmon || Mount Lemmon Survey ||  || align=right | 3.1 km || 
|-id=461 bgcolor=#d6d6d6
| 523461 ||  || — || May 7, 2005 || Mount Lemmon || Mount Lemmon Survey || 7:4 || align=right | 4.2 km || 
|-id=462 bgcolor=#E9E9E9
| 523462 ||  || — || May 31, 2014 || Haleakala || Pan-STARRS ||  || align=right | 1.4 km || 
|-id=463 bgcolor=#d6d6d6
| 523463 ||  || — || March 27, 2012 || Mount Lemmon || Mount Lemmon Survey ||  || align=right | 3.0 km || 
|-id=464 bgcolor=#d6d6d6
| 523464 ||  || — || July 29, 2008 || Kitt Peak || Spacewatch ||  || align=right | 4.4 km || 
|-id=465 bgcolor=#d6d6d6
| 523465 ||  || — || October 1, 2009 || Mount Lemmon || Mount Lemmon Survey ||  || align=right | 3.9 km || 
|-id=466 bgcolor=#E9E9E9
| 523466 ||  || — || October 28, 2010 || Mount Lemmon || Mount Lemmon Survey ||  || align=right | 2.0 km || 
|-id=467 bgcolor=#d6d6d6
| 523467 ||  || — || March 16, 2007 || Kitt Peak || Spacewatch ||  || align=right | 1.8 km || 
|-id=468 bgcolor=#d6d6d6
| 523468 ||  || — || November 11, 2004 || Kitt Peak || Spacewatch || EOS || align=right | 2.4 km || 
|-id=469 bgcolor=#E9E9E9
| 523469 ||  || — || August 8, 2010 || WISE || WISE ||  || align=right | 2.4 km || 
|-id=470 bgcolor=#E9E9E9
| 523470 ||  || — || November 1, 2010 || Mount Lemmon || Mount Lemmon Survey ||  || align=right | 1.5 km || 
|-id=471 bgcolor=#E9E9E9
| 523471 ||  || — || May 18, 2013 || Mount Lemmon || Mount Lemmon Survey ||  || align=right | 1.3 km || 
|-id=472 bgcolor=#E9E9E9
| 523472 ||  || — || March 10, 2008 || Kitt Peak || Spacewatch ||  || align=right | 1.8 km || 
|-id=473 bgcolor=#d6d6d6
| 523473 ||  || — || February 27, 2006 || Kitt Peak || Spacewatch ||  || align=right | 2.3 km || 
|-id=474 bgcolor=#d6d6d6
| 523474 ||  || — || March 24, 2006 || Mount Lemmon || Mount Lemmon Survey ||  || align=right | 3.2 km || 
|-id=475 bgcolor=#E9E9E9
| 523475 ||  || — || September 18, 2010 || Mount Lemmon || Mount Lemmon Survey ||  || align=right | 1.4 km || 
|-id=476 bgcolor=#d6d6d6
| 523476 ||  || — || January 30, 2011 || Mount Lemmon || Mount Lemmon Survey ||  || align=right | 2.4 km || 
|-id=477 bgcolor=#d6d6d6
| 523477 ||  || — || March 29, 2011 || Mount Lemmon || Mount Lemmon Survey ||  || align=right | 3.0 km || 
|-id=478 bgcolor=#d6d6d6
| 523478 ||  || — || March 15, 2011 || Haleakala || Pan-STARRS ||  || align=right | 2.9 km || 
|-id=479 bgcolor=#E9E9E9
| 523479 ||  || — || September 25, 2006 || Catalina || CSS ||  || align=right | 1.9 km || 
|-id=480 bgcolor=#d6d6d6
| 523480 ||  || — || September 27, 2009 || Kitt Peak || Spacewatch ||  || align=right | 2.1 km || 
|-id=481 bgcolor=#d6d6d6
| 523481 ||  || — || September 14, 2013 || Haleakala || Pan-STARRS ||  || align=right | 2.9 km || 
|-id=482 bgcolor=#E9E9E9
| 523482 ||  || — || October 3, 2010 || Kitt Peak || Spacewatch ||  || align=right | 1.3 km || 
|-id=483 bgcolor=#d6d6d6
| 523483 ||  || — || May 29, 2012 || Mount Lemmon || Mount Lemmon Survey ||  || align=right | 2.3 km || 
|-id=484 bgcolor=#d6d6d6
| 523484 ||  || — || February 4, 2011 || Haleakala || Pan-STARRS ||  || align=right | 2.3 km || 
|-id=485 bgcolor=#E9E9E9
| 523485 ||  || — || September 28, 2006 || Mount Lemmon || Mount Lemmon Survey ||  || align=right | 1.6 km || 
|-id=486 bgcolor=#d6d6d6
| 523486 ||  || — || September 6, 2013 || Kitt Peak || Spacewatch ||  || align=right | 2.2 km || 
|-id=487 bgcolor=#E9E9E9
| 523487 ||  || — || January 4, 2016 || Haleakala || Pan-STARRS ||  || align=right | 1.9 km || 
|-id=488 bgcolor=#d6d6d6
| 523488 ||  || — || March 26, 2011 || Mount Lemmon || Mount Lemmon Survey ||  || align=right | 2.6 km || 
|-id=489 bgcolor=#d6d6d6
| 523489 ||  || — || October 31, 2008 || Kitt Peak || Spacewatch ||  || align=right | 3.5 km || 
|-id=490 bgcolor=#E9E9E9
| 523490 ||  || — || February 19, 2012 || Kitt Peak || Spacewatch ||  || align=right | 2.5 km || 
|-id=491 bgcolor=#d6d6d6
| 523491 ||  || — || September 4, 2007 || Catalina || CSS ||  || align=right | 3.6 km || 
|-id=492 bgcolor=#d6d6d6
| 523492 ||  || — || January 30, 2006 || Kitt Peak || Spacewatch ||  || align=right | 2.8 km || 
|-id=493 bgcolor=#d6d6d6
| 523493 ||  || — || May 6, 2006 || Mount Lemmon || Mount Lemmon Survey ||  || align=right | 2.8 km || 
|-id=494 bgcolor=#E9E9E9
| 523494 ||  || — || November 23, 2006 || Kitt Peak || Spacewatch ||  || align=right | 1.9 km || 
|-id=495 bgcolor=#d6d6d6
| 523495 ||  || — || October 6, 1996 || Kitt Peak || Spacewatch ||  || align=right | 4.0 km || 
|-id=496 bgcolor=#E9E9E9
| 523496 ||  || — || March 23, 2012 || Mount Lemmon || Mount Lemmon Survey ||  || align=right | 2.1 km || 
|-id=497 bgcolor=#d6d6d6
| 523497 ||  || — || June 18, 2006 || Kitt Peak || Spacewatch ||  || align=right | 2.0 km || 
|-id=498 bgcolor=#d6d6d6
| 523498 ||  || — || January 30, 2011 || Haleakala || Pan-STARRS ||  || align=right | 2.1 km || 
|-id=499 bgcolor=#E9E9E9
| 523499 ||  || — || November 11, 2010 || Mount Lemmon || Mount Lemmon Survey ||  || align=right | 1.4 km || 
|-id=500 bgcolor=#d6d6d6
| 523500 ||  || — || April 7, 2006 || Kitt Peak || Spacewatch ||  || align=right | 2.4 km || 
|}

523501–523600 

|-bgcolor=#E9E9E9
| 523501 ||  || — || December 30, 2007 || Mount Lemmon || Mount Lemmon Survey ||  || align=right data-sort-value="0.80" | 800 m || 
|-id=502 bgcolor=#d6d6d6
| 523502 ||  || — || December 24, 2014 || Mount Lemmon || Mount Lemmon Survey ||  || align=right | 2.4 km || 
|-id=503 bgcolor=#d6d6d6
| 523503 ||  || — || April 2, 2011 || Haleakala || Pan-STARRS ||  || align=right | 2.9 km || 
|-id=504 bgcolor=#d6d6d6
| 523504 ||  || — || April 3, 2010 || WISE || WISE ||  || align=right | 3.6 km || 
|-id=505 bgcolor=#d6d6d6
| 523505 ||  || — || May 7, 2000 || Socorro || LINEAR ||  || align=right | 3.5 km || 
|-id=506 bgcolor=#E9E9E9
| 523506 ||  || — || October 25, 2014 || Haleakala || Pan-STARRS ||  || align=right | 1.6 km || 
|-id=507 bgcolor=#d6d6d6
| 523507 ||  || — || May 3, 2011 || Kitt Peak || Spacewatch ||  || align=right | 2.7 km || 
|-id=508 bgcolor=#E9E9E9
| 523508 ||  || — || January 26, 2011 || Mount Lemmon || Mount Lemmon Survey ||  || align=right | 2.2 km || 
|-id=509 bgcolor=#E9E9E9
| 523509 ||  || — || April 24, 2012 || Mount Lemmon || Mount Lemmon Survey ||  || align=right | 1.8 km || 
|-id=510 bgcolor=#E9E9E9
| 523510 ||  || — || August 22, 2004 || Kitt Peak || Spacewatch ||  || align=right | 1.2 km || 
|-id=511 bgcolor=#d6d6d6
| 523511 ||  || — || December 22, 2008 || Kitt Peak || Spacewatch ||  || align=right | 2.9 km || 
|-id=512 bgcolor=#E9E9E9
| 523512 ||  || — || February 20, 2012 || Haleakala || Pan-STARRS ||  || align=right | 1.1 km || 
|-id=513 bgcolor=#fefefe
| 523513 ||  || — || February 12, 2008 || Mount Lemmon || Mount Lemmon Survey ||  || align=right data-sort-value="0.91" | 910 m || 
|-id=514 bgcolor=#E9E9E9
| 523514 ||  || — || August 26, 2013 || Haleakala || Pan-STARRS ||  || align=right | 1.6 km || 
|-id=515 bgcolor=#d6d6d6
| 523515 ||  || — || November 9, 2008 || Kitt Peak || Spacewatch ||  || align=right | 2.7 km || 
|-id=516 bgcolor=#fefefe
| 523516 ||  || — || January 19, 2005 || Kitt Peak || Spacewatch ||  || align=right data-sort-value="0.82" | 820 m || 
|-id=517 bgcolor=#E9E9E9
| 523517 ||  || — || November 26, 2014 || Haleakala || Pan-STARRS ||  || align=right | 1.9 km || 
|-id=518 bgcolor=#E9E9E9
| 523518 ||  || — || November 19, 2006 || Kitt Peak || Spacewatch ||  || align=right | 1.1 km || 
|-id=519 bgcolor=#E9E9E9
| 523519 ||  || — || January 28, 2011 || Mount Lemmon || Mount Lemmon Survey ||  || align=right | 2.2 km || 
|-id=520 bgcolor=#E9E9E9
| 523520 ||  || — || January 27, 2007 || Kitt Peak || Spacewatch ||  || align=right | 1.4 km || 
|-id=521 bgcolor=#fefefe
| 523521 ||  || — || November 5, 2010 || Mount Lemmon || Mount Lemmon Survey ||  || align=right data-sort-value="0.96" | 960 m || 
|-id=522 bgcolor=#d6d6d6
| 523522 ||  || — || October 11, 2007 || Kitt Peak || Spacewatch ||  || align=right | 2.7 km || 
|-id=523 bgcolor=#E9E9E9
| 523523 ||  || — || December 3, 2010 || Mount Lemmon || Mount Lemmon Survey ||  || align=right | 1.9 km || 
|-id=524 bgcolor=#E9E9E9
| 523524 ||  || — || August 23, 2004 || Kitt Peak || Spacewatch ||  || align=right | 1.2 km || 
|-id=525 bgcolor=#d6d6d6
| 523525 ||  || — || August 13, 2012 || Kitt Peak || Spacewatch ||  || align=right | 3.2 km || 
|-id=526 bgcolor=#E9E9E9
| 523526 ||  || — || January 8, 2010 || Kitt Peak || Spacewatch ||  || align=right | 1.5 km || 
|-id=527 bgcolor=#d6d6d6
| 523527 ||  || — || October 25, 2012 || Mount Lemmon || Mount Lemmon Survey ||  || align=right | 2.9 km || 
|-id=528 bgcolor=#d6d6d6
| 523528 ||  || — || December 20, 2004 || Mount Lemmon || Mount Lemmon Survey ||  || align=right | 2.2 km || 
|-id=529 bgcolor=#d6d6d6
| 523529 ||  || — || September 26, 2006 || Kitt Peak || Spacewatch ||  || align=right | 2.7 km || 
|-id=530 bgcolor=#E9E9E9
| 523530 ||  || — || February 25, 2011 || Mount Lemmon || Mount Lemmon Survey ||  || align=right | 1.1 km || 
|-id=531 bgcolor=#d6d6d6
| 523531 ||  || — || August 30, 2005 || Kitt Peak || Spacewatch ||  || align=right | 2.9 km || 
|-id=532 bgcolor=#E9E9E9
| 523532 ||  || — || October 3, 2013 || Haleakala || Pan-STARRS ||  || align=right | 1.1 km || 
|-id=533 bgcolor=#E9E9E9
| 523533 ||  || — || September 3, 2008 || Kitt Peak || Spacewatch ||  || align=right | 2.0 km || 
|-id=534 bgcolor=#d6d6d6
| 523534 ||  || — || August 19, 2006 || Kitt Peak || Spacewatch ||  || align=right | 2.4 km || 
|-id=535 bgcolor=#E9E9E9
| 523535 ||  || — || November 27, 2006 || Mount Lemmon || Mount Lemmon Survey ||  || align=right data-sort-value="0.97" | 970 m || 
|-id=536 bgcolor=#d6d6d6
| 523536 ||  || — || February 5, 2009 || Kitt Peak || Spacewatch ||  || align=right | 2.8 km || 
|-id=537 bgcolor=#fefefe
| 523537 ||  || — || January 19, 2012 || Haleakala || Pan-STARRS ||  || align=right data-sort-value="0.82" | 820 m || 
|-id=538 bgcolor=#E9E9E9
| 523538 ||  || — || March 13, 2011 || Mount Lemmon || Mount Lemmon Survey ||  || align=right | 2.0 km || 
|-id=539 bgcolor=#E9E9E9
| 523539 ||  || — || September 17, 2009 || Mount Lemmon || Mount Lemmon Survey ||  || align=right data-sort-value="0.69" | 690 m || 
|-id=540 bgcolor=#d6d6d6
| 523540 ||  || — || January 1, 2008 || Kitt Peak || Spacewatch ||  || align=right | 3.2 km || 
|-id=541 bgcolor=#E9E9E9
| 523541 ||  || — || June 7, 2016 || Mount Lemmon || Mount Lemmon Survey ||  || align=right data-sort-value="0.93" | 930 m || 
|-id=542 bgcolor=#d6d6d6
| 523542 ||  || — || November 1, 2006 || Kitt Peak || Spacewatch ||  || align=right | 2.4 km || 
|-id=543 bgcolor=#E9E9E9
| 523543 ||  || — || April 29, 2008 || Mount Lemmon || Mount Lemmon Survey ||  || align=right data-sort-value="0.81" | 810 m || 
|-id=544 bgcolor=#d6d6d6
| 523544 ||  || — || January 10, 2014 || Kitt Peak || Spacewatch ||  || align=right | 2.4 km || 
|-id=545 bgcolor=#E9E9E9
| 523545 ||  || — || July 29, 2008 || Kitt Peak || Spacewatch ||  || align=right | 1.3 km || 
|-id=546 bgcolor=#d6d6d6
| 523546 ||  || — || September 2, 2011 || Haleakala || Pan-STARRS ||  || align=right | 2.4 km || 
|-id=547 bgcolor=#d6d6d6
| 523547 ||  || — || October 8, 2012 || Kitt Peak || Spacewatch ||  || align=right | 2.6 km || 
|-id=548 bgcolor=#d6d6d6
| 523548 ||  || — || September 26, 2006 || Kitt Peak || Spacewatch ||  || align=right | 2.5 km || 
|-id=549 bgcolor=#d6d6d6
| 523549 ||  || — || October 21, 2006 || Kitt Peak || Spacewatch ||  || align=right | 2.9 km || 
|-id=550 bgcolor=#fefefe
| 523550 ||  || — || February 22, 2007 || Kitt Peak || Spacewatch ||  || align=right data-sort-value="0.71" | 710 m || 
|-id=551 bgcolor=#fefefe
| 523551 ||  || — || March 4, 2012 || Mount Lemmon || Mount Lemmon Survey ||  || align=right data-sort-value="0.71" | 710 m || 
|-id=552 bgcolor=#d6d6d6
| 523552 ||  || — || December 21, 2012 || Mount Lemmon || Mount Lemmon Survey ||  || align=right | 3.0 km || 
|-id=553 bgcolor=#d6d6d6
| 523553 ||  || — || September 21, 2011 || Catalina || CSS ||  || align=right | 3.5 km || 
|-id=554 bgcolor=#E9E9E9
| 523554 ||  || — || January 31, 2006 || Kitt Peak || Spacewatch ||  || align=right | 1.3 km || 
|-id=555 bgcolor=#d6d6d6
| 523555 ||  || — || December 17, 2007 || Kitt Peak || Spacewatch ||  || align=right | 2.2 km || 
|-id=556 bgcolor=#E9E9E9
| 523556 ||  || — || September 6, 2008 || Mount Lemmon || Mount Lemmon Survey ||  || align=right data-sort-value="0.95" | 950 m || 
|-id=557 bgcolor=#d6d6d6
| 523557 ||  || — || December 30, 2007 || Kitt Peak || Spacewatch ||  || align=right | 2.2 km || 
|-id=558 bgcolor=#d6d6d6
| 523558 ||  || — || November 23, 2006 || Mount Lemmon || Mount Lemmon Survey ||  || align=right | 2.3 km || 
|-id=559 bgcolor=#d6d6d6
| 523559 ||  || — || September 29, 2011 || Mount Lemmon || Mount Lemmon Survey ||  || align=right | 2.4 km || 
|-id=560 bgcolor=#E9E9E9
| 523560 ||  || — || October 6, 2008 || Kitt Peak || Spacewatch ||  || align=right | 1.3 km || 
|-id=561 bgcolor=#E9E9E9
| 523561 ||  || — || October 31, 2013 || Mount Lemmon || Mount Lemmon Survey ||  || align=right | 1.7 km || 
|-id=562 bgcolor=#fefefe
| 523562 ||  || — || November 14, 2010 || Mount Lemmon || Mount Lemmon Survey ||  || align=right data-sort-value="0.87" | 870 m || 
|-id=563 bgcolor=#E9E9E9
| 523563 ||  || — || July 29, 2008 || Kitt Peak || Spacewatch ||  || align=right data-sort-value="0.99" | 990 m || 
|-id=564 bgcolor=#E9E9E9
| 523564 ||  || — || October 16, 2012 || Catalina || CSS ||  || align=right | 1.6 km || 
|-id=565 bgcolor=#E9E9E9
| 523565 ||  || — || March 5, 2010 || Catalina || CSS ||  || align=right | 1.3 km || 
|-id=566 bgcolor=#E9E9E9
| 523566 ||  || — || August 23, 2007 || Kitt Peak || Spacewatch ||  || align=right data-sort-value="0.83" | 830 m || 
|-id=567 bgcolor=#E9E9E9
| 523567 ||  || — || February 14, 2010 || Kitt Peak || Spacewatch ||  || align=right | 1.0 km || 
|-id=568 bgcolor=#E9E9E9
| 523568 ||  || — || November 12, 2012 || Kitt Peak || Spacewatch ||  || align=right | 2.1 km || 
|-id=569 bgcolor=#E9E9E9
| 523569 ||  || — || March 9, 2014 || Haleakala || Pan-STARRS ||  || align=right | 1.8 km || 
|-id=570 bgcolor=#d6d6d6
| 523570 ||  || — || January 17, 2007 || Kitt Peak || Spacewatch ||  || align=right | 2.9 km || 
|-id=571 bgcolor=#E9E9E9
| 523571 ||  || — || November 9, 2007 || Kitt Peak || Spacewatch ||  || align=right | 1.7 km || 
|-id=572 bgcolor=#d6d6d6
| 523572 ||  || — || December 27, 2005 || Mount Lemmon || Mount Lemmon Survey ||  || align=right | 3.3 km || 
|-id=573 bgcolor=#d6d6d6
| 523573 ||  || — || December 25, 2005 || Kitt Peak || Spacewatch ||  || align=right | 2.9 km || 
|-id=574 bgcolor=#d6d6d6
| 523574 ||  || — || March 9, 2007 || Catalina || CSS ||  || align=right | 3.4 km || 
|-id=575 bgcolor=#E9E9E9
| 523575 ||  || — || April 20, 2010 || Mount Lemmon || Mount Lemmon Survey ||  || align=right | 1.8 km || 
|-id=576 bgcolor=#fefefe
| 523576 ||  || — || February 23, 2007 || Catalina || CSS ||  || align=right data-sort-value="0.88" | 880 m || 
|-id=577 bgcolor=#E9E9E9
| 523577 ||  || — || October 18, 2012 || Haleakala || Pan-STARRS ||  || align=right | 1.5 km || 
|-id=578 bgcolor=#d6d6d6
| 523578 ||  || — || March 10, 2007 || Catalina || CSS || Tj (2.98) || align=right | 3.0 km || 
|-id=579 bgcolor=#E9E9E9
| 523579 ||  || — || March 7, 2005 || Socorro || LINEAR ||  || align=right | 1.5 km || 
|-id=580 bgcolor=#fefefe
| 523580 ||  || — || March 8, 2005 || Mount Lemmon || Mount Lemmon Survey || H || align=right data-sort-value="0.68" | 680 m || 
|-id=581 bgcolor=#FA8072
| 523581 ||  || — || August 13, 2010 || Kitt Peak || Spacewatch ||  || align=right | 1.1 km || 
|-id=582 bgcolor=#fefefe
| 523582 ||  || — || July 29, 2008 || Mount Lemmon || Mount Lemmon Survey || H || align=right data-sort-value="0.80" | 800 m || 
|-id=583 bgcolor=#fefefe
| 523583 ||  || — || October 20, 2003 || Kitt Peak || Spacewatch ||  || align=right data-sort-value="0.66" | 660 m || 
|-id=584 bgcolor=#E9E9E9
| 523584 ||  || — || February 19, 2010 || WISE || WISE ||  || align=right | 1.1 km || 
|-id=585 bgcolor=#FFC2E0
| 523585 ||  || — || June 24, 1998 || Socorro || LINEAR || APO || align=right data-sort-value="0.55" | 550 m || 
|-id=586 bgcolor=#FFC2E0
| 523586 ||  || — || June 4, 1999 || Catalina || CSS || ATE || align=right data-sort-value="0.14" | 140 m || 
|-id=587 bgcolor=#FFC2E0
| 523587 ||  || — || November 8, 1999 || Socorro || LINEAR || AMO +1km || align=right | 1.1 km || 
|-id=588 bgcolor=#C2E0FF
| 523588 ||  || — || February 6, 2000 || Kitt Peak || M. W. Buie || cubewano (cold)critical || align=right | 382 km || 
|-id=589 bgcolor=#FFC2E0
| 523589 ||  || — || April 16, 2001 || Socorro || LINEAR || APO +1kmPHA || align=right | 1.9 km || 
|-id=590 bgcolor=#FFC2E0
| 523590 ||  || — || August 19, 2001 || Socorro || LINEAR || APO || align=right data-sort-value="0.26" | 260 m || 
|-id=591 bgcolor=#C2E0FF
| 523591 ||  || — || August 19, 2001 || Cerro Tololo || M. W. Buie || cubewano (hot) || align=right | 251 km || 
|-id=592 bgcolor=#FFC2E0
| 523592 ||  || — || September 27, 2001 || Socorro || LINEAR || AMO +1kmcritical || align=right | 1.1 km || 
|-id=593 bgcolor=#FFC2E0
| 523593 ||  || — || October 11, 2001 || Socorro || LINEAR || AMO || align=right data-sort-value="0.52" | 520 m || 
|-id=594 bgcolor=#FFC2E0
| 523594 ||  || — || December 18, 2001 || Socorro || LINEAR || AMOcritical || align=right data-sort-value="0.098" | 98 m || 
|-id=595 bgcolor=#FFC2E0
| 523595 ||  || — || July 19, 2002 || Palomar || NEAT || AMO || align=right data-sort-value="0.66" | 660 m || 
|-id=596 bgcolor=#FFC2E0
| 523596 ||  || — || August 12, 2002 || Socorro || LINEAR || AMO || align=right data-sort-value="0.45" | 450 m || 
|-id=597 bgcolor=#C7FF8F
| 523597 ||  || — || August 26, 2002 || Palomar || C. Trujillo, M. E. Brown || centaur || align=right | 77 km || 
|-id=598 bgcolor=#FFC2E0
| 523598 ||  || — || March 11, 2003 || Socorro || LINEAR || APOPHA || align=right data-sort-value="0.25" | 250 m || 
|-id=599 bgcolor=#FFC2E0
| 523599 ||  || — || September 2, 2003 || Haleakala || NEAT || AMO || align=right data-sort-value="0.40" | 400 m || 
|-id=600 bgcolor=#FFC2E0
| 523600 ||  || — || September 2, 2003 || Socorro || LINEAR || APO || align=right data-sort-value="0.46" | 460 m || 
|}

523601–523700 

|-bgcolor=#C2E0FF
| 523601 ||  || — || October 19, 2003 || Palomar || Palomar Obs. || twotino? || align=right | 355 km || 
|-id=602 bgcolor=#FFC2E0
| 523602 ||  || — || June 9, 2004 || Socorro || LINEAR || AMO || align=right data-sort-value="0.62" | 620 m || 
|-id=603 bgcolor=#FFC2E0
| 523603 ||  || — || August 23, 2004 || Siding Spring || SSS || APOfast? || align=right data-sort-value="0.67" | 670 m || 
|-id=604 bgcolor=#FFC2E0
| 523604 ||  || — || August 25, 2004 || Kitt Peak || Spacewatch || AMO || align=right data-sort-value="0.73" | 730 m || 
|-id=605 bgcolor=#FFC2E0
| 523605 ||  || — || September 8, 2004 || Socorro || LINEAR || ATE || align=right data-sort-value="0.20" | 200 m || 
|-id=606 bgcolor=#FFC2E0
| 523606 ||  || — || February 1, 2005 || Kitt Peak || Spacewatch || APOPHA || align=right data-sort-value="0.32" | 320 m || 
|-id=607 bgcolor=#FFC2E0
| 523607 ||  || — || February 2, 2005 || Socorro || LINEAR || AMO +1km || align=right data-sort-value="0.89" | 890 m || 
|-id=608 bgcolor=#FFC2E0
| 523608 ||  || — || March 4, 2005 || Catalina || CSS || AMOcritical || align=right data-sort-value="0.30" | 300 m || 
|-id=609 bgcolor=#FFC2E0
| 523609 ||  || — || August 4, 2005 || Palomar || NEAT || APOPHAfast? || align=right data-sort-value="0.47" | 470 m || 
|-id=610 bgcolor=#FFC2E0
| 523610 ||  || — || October 1, 2005 || Mount Lemmon || Mount Lemmon Survey || AMO +1km || align=right data-sort-value="0.82" | 820 m || 
|-id=611 bgcolor=#FFC2E0
| 523611 ||  || — || October 27, 2005 || Mount Lemmon || Mount Lemmon Survey || AMO || align=right data-sort-value="0.68" | 680 m || 
|-id=612 bgcolor=#FFC2E0
| 523612 ||  || — || December 29, 2005 || Catalina || CSS || AMO +1kmcritical || align=right data-sort-value="0.81" | 810 m || 
|-id=613 bgcolor=#FFC2E0
| 523613 ||  || — || September 28, 2006 || Mount Lemmon || Mount Lemmon Survey || AMO +1km || align=right data-sort-value="0.92" | 920 m || 
|-id=614 bgcolor=#FFC2E0
| 523614 ||  || — || September 21, 2006 || Catalina || CSS || APO || align=right data-sort-value="0.54" | 540 m || 
|-id=615 bgcolor=#C2E0FF
| 523615 ||  || — || October 19, 2006 || Kitt Peak || Kitt Peak Obs. || cubewano (cold) || align=right | 140 km || 
|-id=616 bgcolor=#FFC2E0
| 523616 ||  || — || June 11, 2007 || Mount Lemmon || Mount Lemmon Survey || APO || align=right data-sort-value="0.64" | 640 m || 
|-id=617 bgcolor=#C2E0FF
| 523617 ||  || — || August 12, 2007 || Palomar || Palomar Obs. || twotino || align=right | 339 km || 
|-id=618 bgcolor=#C2E0FF
| 523618 ||  || — || September 11, 2007 || Palomar || M. E. Schwamb, M. E. Brown, D. L. Rabinowitz || plutino || align=right | 191 km || 
|-id=619 bgcolor=#FFC2E0
| 523619 ||  || — || September 14, 2007 || Catalina || CSS || APOcritical || align=right data-sort-value="0.71" | 710 m || 
|-id=620 bgcolor=#C7FF8F
| 523620 ||  || — || September 15, 2007 || Palomar || Palomar Obs. || centaur || align=right | 84 km || 
|-id=621 bgcolor=#FFC2E0
| 523621 ||  || — || October 7, 2007 || Pla D'Arguines || R. Ferrando || AMO || align=right data-sort-value="0.21" | 210 m || 
|-id=622 bgcolor=#C2E0FF
| 523622 ||  || — || October 3, 2007 || Apache Point || A. C. Becker, A. W. Puckett, J. Kubica || ESDO || align=right | 222 km || 
|-id=623 bgcolor=#FFC2E0
| 523623 ||  || — || February 8, 2008 || Catalina || CSS || APOPHA || align=right data-sort-value="0.43" | 430 m || 
|-id=624 bgcolor=#C2E0FF
| 523624 ||  || — || February 9, 2008 || Palomar || Palomar Obs. || res3:7moon || align=right | 317 km || 
|-id=625 bgcolor=#FFC2E0
| 523625 ||  || — || February 29, 2008 || Catalina || CSS || APOmooncritical || align=right data-sort-value="0.43" | 430 m || 
|-id=626 bgcolor=#FFC2E0
| 523626 ||  || — || August 6, 2008 || Siding Spring || SSS || AMO +1km || align=right | 1.7 km || 
|-id=627 bgcolor=#C2E0FF
| 523627 ||  || — || August 25, 2008 || Palomar || Palomar Obs. || other TNO || align=right | 300 km || 
|-id=628 bgcolor=#FFC2E0
| 523628 ||  || — || September 7, 2008 || Mount Lemmon || Mount Lemmon Survey || AMOcritical || align=right data-sort-value="0.46" | 460 m || 
|-id=629 bgcolor=#C2E0FF
| 523629 ||  || — || September 26, 2008 || Palomar || M. E. Schwamb, M. E. Brown, D. L. Rabinowitz || other TNO || align=right | 297 km || 
|-id=630 bgcolor=#FFC2E0
| 523630 ||  || — || July 17, 2009 || Siding Spring || SSS || APO +1kmPHA || align=right | 2.0 km || 
|-id=631 bgcolor=#FFC2E0
| 523631 ||  || — || September 18, 2009 || Catalina || CSS || APO || align=right data-sort-value="0.56" | 560 m || 
|-id=632 bgcolor=#FFC2E0
| 523632 ||  || — || October 22, 2009 || Catalina || CSS || AMOcritical || align=right data-sort-value="0.31" | 310 m || 
|-id=633 bgcolor=#FFC2E0
| 523633 ||  || — || December 13, 2009 || Catalina || CSS || AMO || align=right data-sort-value="0.67" | 670 m || 
|-id=634 bgcolor=#C2E0FF
| 523634 ||  || — || January 6, 2010 || Kitt Peak || Spacewatch || other TNO || align=right | 295 km || 
|-id=635 bgcolor=#C2E0FF
| 523635 ||  || — || February 26, 2010 || Haleakala || Pan-STARRS || other TNOcritical || align=right | 493 km || 
|-id=636 bgcolor=#FFC2E0
| 523636 ||  || — || March 13, 2010 || WISE || WISE || APO || align=right data-sort-value="0.55" | 550 m || 
|-id=637 bgcolor=#FFC2E0
| 523637 ||  || — || June 13, 2010 || WISE || WISE || APO || align=right data-sort-value="0.6" | 600 m || 
|-id=638 bgcolor=#FFC2E0
| 523638 ||  || — || February 19, 2010 || WISE || WISE || APOcritical || align=right data-sort-value="0.30" | 300 m || 
|-id=639 bgcolor=#C2E0FF
| 523639 ||  || — || July 11, 2010 || Haleakala || Pan-STARRS || SDO || align=right | 595 km || 
|-id=640 bgcolor=#C2E0FF
| 523640 ||  || — || August 4, 2010 || Haleakala || Pan-STARRS || other TNO || align=right | 397 km || 
|-id=641 bgcolor=#FFC2E0
| 523641 ||  || — || September 10, 2010 || Siding Spring || SSS || APO +1kmcritical || align=right | 1.4 km || 
|-id=642 bgcolor=#C2E0FF
| 523642 ||  || — || September 17, 2010 || Haleakala || Pan-STARRS || other TNOcritical || align=right | 312 km || 
|-id=643 bgcolor=#C2E0FF
| 523643 ||  || — || August 4, 2010 || Haleakala || Pan-STARRS || centaur || align=right | 336 km || 
|-id=644 bgcolor=#C2E0FF
| 523644 ||  || — || September 6, 2010 || Haleakala || Pan-STARRS || plutino || align=right | 236 km || 
|-id=645 bgcolor=#C2E0FF
| 523645 ||  || — || November 1, 2010 || Haleakala || Pan-STARRS || other TNO || align=right | 466 km || 
|-id=646 bgcolor=#C2E0FF
| 523646 ||  || — || October 29, 2010 || Haleakala || Pan-STARRS || res3:4 || align=right | 286 km || 
|-id=647 bgcolor=#C2E0FF
| 523647 ||  || — || October 14, 2010 || Haleakala || Pan-STARRS || other TNO || align=right | 272 km || 
|-id=648 bgcolor=#FFC2E0
| 523648 ||  || — || December 20, 2007 || Mount Lemmon || Mount Lemmon Survey || AMO || align=right data-sort-value="0.77" | 770 m || 
|-id=649 bgcolor=#C7FF8F
| 523649 ||  || — || September 24, 2010 || Haleakala || Pan-STARRS || centaur || align=right | 10 km || 
|-id=650 bgcolor=#FFC2E0
| 523650 ||  || — || April 4, 2011 || Mount Lemmon || Mount Lemmon Survey || APOPHA || align=right data-sort-value="0.70" | 700 m || 
|-id=651 bgcolor=#FFC2E0
| 523651 ||  || — || April 11, 2011 || Haleakala || Pan-STARRS || AMO || align=right data-sort-value="0.59" | 590 m || 
|-id=652 bgcolor=#C2E0FF
| 523652 ||  || — || June 15, 2010 || Haleakala || Pan-STARRS || centaur || align=right | 164 km || 
|-id=653 bgcolor=#C2E0FF
| 523653 ||  || — || May 9, 2010 || Haleakala || Pan-STARRS || other TNOcritical || align=right | 425 km || 
|-id=654 bgcolor=#FFC2E0
| 523654 ||  || — || September 19, 2011 || Catalina || CSS || APOPHA || align=right data-sort-value="0.26" | 260 m || 
|-id=655 bgcolor=#C2E0FF
| 523655 ||  || — || October 16, 2010 || Haleakala || Pan-STARRS || plutino || align=right | 298 km || 
|-id=656 bgcolor=#FFC2E0
| 523656 ||  || — || November 17, 2011 || Socorro || LINEAR || APOPHA || align=right data-sort-value="0.49" | 490 m || 
|-id=657 bgcolor=#FFC2E0
| 523657 ||  || — || January 19, 2012 || Haleakala || Pan-STARRS || AMO || align=right data-sort-value="0.30" | 300 m || 
|-id=658 bgcolor=#C2E0FF
| 523658 ||  || — || April 3, 2011 || Haleakala || Pan-STARRS || other TNO || align=right | 272 km || 
|-id=659 bgcolor=#C2E0FF
| 523659 ||  || — || April 20, 2010 || Haleakala || Pan-STARRS || cubewano (hot) || align=right | 369 km || 
|-id=660 bgcolor=#FFC2E0
| 523660 ||  || — || May 21, 2012 || Haleakala || Pan-STARRS || AMO +1km || align=right data-sort-value="0.80" | 800 m || 
|-id=661 bgcolor=#FFC2E0
| 523661 ||  || — || June 14, 2012 || Haleakala || Pan-STARRS || ATE || align=right data-sort-value="0.25" | 250 m || 
|-id=662 bgcolor=#FFC2E0
| 523662 ||  || — || June 18, 2012 || Catalina || CSS || APOPHAcritical || align=right data-sort-value="0.25" | 250 m || 
|-id=663 bgcolor=#FFC2E0
| 523663 ||  || — || July 18, 2012 || Catalina || CSS || AMOcritical || align=right data-sort-value="0.34" | 340 m || 
|-id=664 bgcolor=#FFC2E0
| 523664 ||  || — || July 19, 2012 || La Sagra || OAM Obs. || ATEPHA || align=right data-sort-value="0.35" | 350 m || 
|-id=665 bgcolor=#FFC2E0
| 523665 ||  || — || September 13, 2012 || Siding Spring || SSS || AMO || align=right data-sort-value="0.35" | 350 m || 
|-id=666 bgcolor=#FFC2E0
| 523666 ||  || — || September 14, 2012 || La Sagra || OAM Obs. || AMOcritical || align=right data-sort-value="0.20" | 200 m || 
|-id=667 bgcolor=#FFC2E0
| 523667 ||  || — || October 10, 2012 || Catalina || CSS || AMOcritical || align=right data-sort-value="0.41" | 410 m || 
|-id=668 bgcolor=#FFC2E0
| 523668 ||  || — || October 16, 2012 || Mount Lemmon || Mount Lemmon Survey || AMO || align=right data-sort-value="0.41" | 410 m || 
|-id=669 bgcolor=#FFC2E0
| 523669 ||  || — || December 10, 2012 || Haleakala || Pan-STARRS || AMOcritical || align=right data-sort-value="0.74" | 740 m || 
|-id=670 bgcolor=#FFC2E0
| 523670 ||  || — || March 8, 2013 || Haleakala || Pan-STARRS || AMO || align=right data-sort-value="0.49" | 490 m || 
|-id=671 bgcolor=#C2E0FF
| 523671 ||  || — || March 16, 2013 || Cerro Tololo || S. S. Sheppard || twotino? || align=right | 595 km || 
|-id=672 bgcolor=#C2E0FF
| 523672 ||  || — || March 16, 2013 || Cerro Tololo || S. S. Sheppard || centaur || align=right | 106 km || 
|-id=673 bgcolor=#C7FF8F
| 523673 ||  || — || August 4, 2010 || Haleakala || Pan-STARRS || centaur || align=right | 107 km || 
|-id=674 bgcolor=#C2E0FF
| 523674 ||  || — || July 26, 2011 || Haleakala || Pan-STARRS || other TNOcritical || align=right | 331 km || 
|-id=675 bgcolor=#C2E0FF
| 523675 ||  || — || August 6, 2010 || Haleakala || Pan-STARRS || SDOcritical || align=right | 321 km || 
|-id=676 bgcolor=#C7FF8F
| 523676 ||  || — || August 18, 2010 || Haleakala || Pan-STARRS || centaur || align=right | 12 km || 
|-id=677 bgcolor=#C2E0FF
| 523677 ||  || — || July 19, 2010 || Haleakala || Pan-STARRS || res3:5 || align=right | 249 km || 
|-id=678 bgcolor=#C2E0FF
| 523678 ||  || — || March 30, 2011 || Haleakala || Pan-STARRS || cubewano (cold) || align=right | 365 km || 
|-id=679 bgcolor=#FFC2E0
| 523679 ||  || — || December 27, 2013 || Mount Lemmon || Mount Lemmon Survey || AMO +1km || align=right data-sort-value="0.95" | 950 m || 
|-id=680 bgcolor=#C2E0FF
| 523680 ||  || — || November 10, 2011 || Haleakala || Pan-STARRS || SDO || align=right | 330 km || 
|-id=681 bgcolor=#C2E0FF
| 523681 ||  || — || January 25, 2012 || Haleakala || Pan-STARRS || cubewano? || align=right | 493 km || 
|-id=682 bgcolor=#C7FF8F
| 523682 ||  || — || March 15, 2012 || Haleakala || Pan-STARRS || centaur || align=right | 77 km || 
|-id=683 bgcolor=#C2E0FF
| 523683 ||  || — || October 29, 2011 || Haleakala || Pan-STARRS || SDO || align=right | 250 km || 
|-id=684 bgcolor=#C2E0FF
| 523684 ||  || — || March 13, 2011 || Haleakala || Pan-STARRS || cubewano (hot) || align=right | 315 km || 
|-id=685 bgcolor=#FFC2E0
| 523685 ||  || — || February 28, 2014 || Haleakala || Pan-STARRS || APOPHAcritical || align=right data-sort-value="0.35" | 350 m || 
|-id=686 bgcolor=#C7FF8F
| 523686 ||  || — || April 12, 2010 || Haleakala || Pan-STARRS || centaur || align=right | 67 km || 
|-id=687 bgcolor=#C2E0FF
| 523687 ||  || — || April 12, 2011 || Haleakala || Pan-STARRS || other TNO || align=right | 342 km || 
|-id=688 bgcolor=#C2E0FF
| 523688 ||  || — || April 28, 2011 || Haleakala || Pan-STARRS || res3:5 || align=right | 341 km || 
|-id=689 bgcolor=#C2E0FF
| 523689 ||  || — || March 12, 2011 || Haleakala || Pan-STARRS || other TNOcritical || align=right | 247 km || 
|-id=690 bgcolor=#C2E0FF
| 523690 ||  || — || January 5, 2012 || Haleakala || Pan-STARRS || cubewano (hot) || align=right | 382 km || 
|-id=691 bgcolor=#C2E0FF
| 523691 ||  || — || January 15, 2012 || Haleakala || Pan-STARRS || twotino || align=right | 320 km || 
|-id=692 bgcolor=#C2E0FF
| 523692 ||  || — || April 18, 2010 || Haleakala || Pan-STARRS || other TNOcritical || align=right | 729 km || 
|-id=693 bgcolor=#C2E0FF
| 523693 ||  || — || March 24, 2014 || Cerro Tololo || S. S. Sheppard || other TNOcritical || align=right | 443 km || 
|-id=694 bgcolor=#FFC2E0
| 523694 ||  || — || April 8, 2014 || Mount Lemmon || Mount Lemmon Survey || AMOcritical || align=right data-sort-value="0.26" | 260 m || 
|-id=695 bgcolor=#C2E0FF
| 523695 ||  || — || April 12, 2010 || Haleakala || Pan-STARRS || centaur || align=right | 222 km || 
|-id=696 bgcolor=#C2E0FF
| 523696 ||  || — || February 2, 2011 || Haleakala || Pan-STARRS || other TNO || align=right | 335 km || 
|-id=697 bgcolor=#C2E0FF
| 523697 ||  || — || April 21, 2011 || Haleakala || Pan-STARRS || plutino || align=right | 190 km || 
|-id=698 bgcolor=#C2E0FF
| 523698 ||  || — || March 13, 2011 || Haleakala || Pan-STARRS || SDOcritical || align=right | 202 km || 
|-id=699 bgcolor=#C2E0FF
| 523699 ||  || — || April 3, 2011 || Haleakala || Pan-STARRS || SDOcritical || align=right | 255 km || 
|-id=700 bgcolor=#C2E0FF
| 523700 ||  || — || March 25, 2010 || Haleakala || Pan-STARRS || plutino || align=right | 168 km || 
|}

523701–523800 

|-bgcolor=#C2E0FF
| 523701 ||  || — || May 6, 2010 || Haleakala || Pan-STARRS || plutinocritical || align=right | 150 km || 
|-id=702 bgcolor=#C2E0FF
| 523702 ||  || — || January 30, 2011 || Haleakala || Pan-STARRS || cubewano?critical || align=right | 274 km || 
|-id=703 bgcolor=#C2E0FF
| 523703 ||  || — || April 4, 2010 || Haleakala || Pan-STARRS || plutinocritical || align=right | 163 km || 
|-id=704 bgcolor=#C2E0FF
| 523704 ||  || — || January 2, 2014 || Haleakala || Pan-STARRS || plutinocritical || align=right | 138 km || 
|-id=705 bgcolor=#C2E0FF
| 523705 ||  || — || April 13, 2011 || Haleakala || Pan-STARRS || SDOcritical || align=right | 222 km || 
|-id=706 bgcolor=#C2E0FF
| 523706 ||  || — || May 20, 2012 || Haleakala || Pan-STARRS || SDO || align=right | 293 km || 
|-id=707 bgcolor=#FFC2E0
| 523707 ||  || — || May 4, 2014 || Haleakala || Pan-STARRS || AMO || align=right data-sort-value="0.18" | 180 m || 
|-id=708 bgcolor=#C7FF8F
| 523708 ||  || — || April 28, 2011 || Haleakala || Pan-STARRS || centaurcritical || align=right | 28 km || 
|-id=709 bgcolor=#C7FF8F
| 523709 ||  || — || June 18, 2013 || Haleakala || Pan-STARRS || centaur || align=right | 64 km || 
|-id=710 bgcolor=#C2E0FF
| 523710 ||  || — || August 3, 2011 || Haleakala || Pan-STARRS || centaurcritical || align=right | 73 km || 
|-id=711 bgcolor=#C2E0FF
| 523711 ||  || — || July 27, 2011 || Haleakala || Pan-STARRS || other TNOcritical || align=right | 180 km || 
|-id=712 bgcolor=#C2E0FF
| 523712 ||  || — || May 9, 2010 || Haleakala || Pan-STARRS || other TNOcritical || align=right | 317 km || 
|-id=713 bgcolor=#C2E0FF
| 523713 ||  || — || May 9, 2010 || Haleakala || Pan-STARRS || res2:5critical || align=right | 250 km || 
|-id=714 bgcolor=#C7FF8F
| 523714 ||  || — || April 27, 2011 || Haleakala || Pan-STARRS || centaurcritical || align=right | 22 km || 
|-id=715 bgcolor=#C2E0FF
| 523715 ||  || — || April 12, 2010 || Haleakala || Pan-STARRS || plutino || align=right | 245 km || 
|-id=716 bgcolor=#C2E0FF
| 523716 ||  || — || May 10, 2010 || Haleakala || Pan-STARRS || other TNO || align=right | 273 km || 
|-id=717 bgcolor=#C2E0FF
| 523717 ||  || — || May 10, 2010 || Haleakala || Pan-STARRS || plutino || align=right | 233 km || 
|-id=718 bgcolor=#C2E0FF
| 523718 ||  || — || May 9, 2010 || Haleakala || Pan-STARRS || SDO || align=right | 233 km || 
|-id=719 bgcolor=#C2E0FF
| 523719 ||  || — || May 16, 2013 || Haleakala || Pan-STARRS || centaur || align=right | 46 km || 
|-id=720 bgcolor=#C2E0FF
| 523720 ||  || — || May 11, 2011 || Haleakala || Pan-STARRS || centaur || align=right | 94 km || 
|-id=721 bgcolor=#C2E0FF
| 523721 ||  || — || August 5, 2010 || Haleakala || Pan-STARRS || cubewano (cold) || align=right | 377 km || 
|-id=722 bgcolor=#C2E0FF
| 523722 ||  || — || July 28, 2011 || Haleakala || Pan-STARRS || SDOcritical || align=right | 311 km || 
|-id=723 bgcolor=#C2E0FF
| 523723 ||  || — || August 18, 2010 || Haleakala || Pan-STARRS || other TNO || align=right | 301 km || 
|-id=724 bgcolor=#C2E0FF
| 523724 ||  || — || June 14, 2010 || Haleakala || Pan-STARRS || cubewano (cold) || align=right | 382 km || 
|-id=725 bgcolor=#C2E0FF
| 523725 ||  || — || August 18, 2010 || Haleakala || Pan-STARRS || res6:11critical || align=right | 260 km || 
|-id=726 bgcolor=#C2E0FF
| 523726 ||  || — || June 28, 2014 || Haleakala || Pan-STARRS || SDOcritical || align=right | 251 km || 
|-id=727 bgcolor=#C7FF8F
| 523727 ||  || — || July 14, 2010 || Haleakala || Pan-STARRS || centaur || align=right | 220 km || 
|-id=728 bgcolor=#FFC2E0
| 523728 ||  || — || July 28, 2014 || Haleakala || Pan-STARRS || APO || align=right data-sort-value="0.11" | 110 m || 
|-id=729 bgcolor=#C7FF8F
| 523729 ||  || — || July 3, 2013 || Haleakala || Pan-STARRS || centaur || align=right | 27 km || 
|-id=730 bgcolor=#C2E0FF
| 523730 ||  || — || July 19, 2010 || Haleakala || Pan-STARRS || cubewano? || align=right | 267 km || 
|-id=731 bgcolor=#C2E0FF
| 523731 ||  || — || October 8, 2010 || Haleakala || Pan-STARRS || res3:5 || align=right | 245 km || 
|-id=732 bgcolor=#FFC2E0
| 523732 ||  || — || August 4, 2014 || La Sagra || OAM Obs. || APOPHA || align=right data-sort-value="0.26" | 260 m || 
|-id=733 bgcolor=#C2E0FF
| 523733 ||  || — || August 18, 2010 || Haleakala || Pan-STARRS || centaur || align=right | 37 km || 
|-id=734 bgcolor=#C2E0FF
| 523734 ||  || — || August 31, 2010 || Haleakala || Pan-STARRS || centaur || align=right | 78 km || 
|-id=735 bgcolor=#C2E0FF
| 523735 ||  || — || September 12, 2010 || Haleakala || Pan-STARRS || other TNO || align=right | 344 km || 
|-id=736 bgcolor=#C2E0FF
| 523736 ||  || — || September 8, 2010 || Haleakala || Pan-STARRS || other TNO || align=right | 374 km || 
|-id=737 bgcolor=#FFC2E0
| 523737 ||  || — || September 1, 2014 || Catalina || CSS || AMO || align=right data-sort-value="0.26" | 260 m || 
|-id=738 bgcolor=#C2E0FF
| 523738 ||  || — || September 2, 2010 || Haleakala || Pan-STARRS || other TNO || align=right | 363 km || 
|-id=739 bgcolor=#C2E0FF
| 523739 ||  || — || August 8, 2013 || Haleakala || Pan-STARRS || centaur || align=right | 24 km || 
|-id=740 bgcolor=#C7FF8F
| 523740 ||  || — || January 24, 2012 || Haleakala || Pan-STARRS || centaur || align=right | 56 km || 
|-id=741 bgcolor=#C2E0FF
| 523741 ||  || — || October 8, 2010 || Haleakala || Pan-STARRS || other TNO || align=right | 203 km || 
|-id=742 bgcolor=#C2E0FF
| 523742 ||  || — || October 31, 2012 || Haleakala || Pan-STARRS || res4:7critical || align=right | 479 km || 
|-id=743 bgcolor=#C2E0FF
| 523743 ||  || — || August 21, 2010 || Haleakala || Pan-STARRS || res3:5 || align=right | 271 km || 
|-id=744 bgcolor=#C2E0FF
| 523744 ||  || — || May 10, 2010 || Haleakala || Pan-STARRS || cubewano (cold)critical || align=right | 304 km || 
|-id=745 bgcolor=#C2E0FF
| 523745 ||  || — || May 6, 2010 || Haleakala || Pan-STARRS || cubewano (cold) || align=right | 375 km || 
|-id=746 bgcolor=#C2E0FF
| 523746 ||  || — || September 17, 2010 || Haleakala || Pan-STARRS || centaur || align=right | 70 km || 
|-id=747 bgcolor=#FFC2E0
| 523747 ||  || — || September 18, 2014 || Haleakala || Pan-STARRS || APO || align=right data-sort-value="0.87" | 870 m || 
|-id=748 bgcolor=#C2E0FF
| 523748 ||  || — || November 11, 2010 || Haleakala || Pan-STARRS || other TNO || align=right | 274 km || 
|-id=749 bgcolor=#C2E0FF
| 523749 ||  || — || October 29, 2010 || Haleakala || Pan-STARRS || other TNO || align=right | 336 km || 
|-id=750 bgcolor=#C2E0FF
| 523750 ||  || — || September 23, 2011 || Haleakala || Pan-STARRS || cubewano (hot) || align=right | 453 km || 
|-id=751 bgcolor=#C2E0FF
| 523751 ||  || — || September 2, 2010 || Haleakala || Pan-STARRS || plutino || align=right | 165 km || 
|-id=752 bgcolor=#C2E0FF
| 523752 ||  || — || October 10, 2010 || Haleakala || Pan-STARRS || other TNO || align=right | 431 km || 
|-id=753 bgcolor=#C2E0FF
| 523753 ||  || — || December 7, 2013 || Haleakala || Pan-STARRS || centaur || align=right | 58 km || 
|-id=754 bgcolor=#C7FF8F
| 523754 ||  || — || December 30, 2013 || Haleakala || Pan-STARRS || centaurcritical || align=right | 27 km || 
|-id=755 bgcolor=#C2E0FF
| 523755 ||  || — || March 3, 2010 || Haleakala || Pan-STARRS || centaur || align=right | 117 km || 
|-id=756 bgcolor=#C2E0FF
| 523756 ||  || — || October 8, 2010 || Haleakala || Pan-STARRS || cubewano (cold)moon || align=right | 274 km || 
|-id=757 bgcolor=#C2E0FF
| 523757 ||  || — || December 16, 2011 || Haleakala || Pan-STARRS || other TNO || align=right | 404 km || 
|-id=758 bgcolor=#C2E0FF
| 523758 ||  || — || May 6, 2010 || Haleakala || Pan-STARRS || other TNOcritical || align=right | 322 km || 
|-id=759 bgcolor=#C2E0FF
| 523759 ||  || — || September 14, 2010 || Haleakala || Pan-STARRS || other TNO || align=right | 576 km || 
|-id=760 bgcolor=#C2E0FF
| 523760 ||  || — || January 1, 2013 || Haleakala || Pan-STARRS || plutinocritical || align=right | 302 km || 
|-id=761 bgcolor=#C2E0FF
| 523761 ||  || — || November 11, 2010 || Haleakala || Pan-STARRS || other TNO || align=right | 293 km || 
|-id=762 bgcolor=#C2E0FF
| 523762 ||  || — || June 5, 2010 || Haleakala || Pan-STARRS || cubewano? || align=right | 249 km || 
|-id=763 bgcolor=#C2E0FF
| 523763 ||  || — || December 23, 2011 || Haleakala || Pan-STARRS || other TNOcritical || align=right | 342 km || 
|-id=764 bgcolor=#C2E0FF
| 523764 ||  || — || September 8, 2011 || Haleakala || Pan-STARRS || plutinomoon || align=right | 156 km || 
|-id=765 bgcolor=#C2E0FF
| 523765 ||  || — || November 10, 2011 || Haleakala || Pan-STARRS || SDOcritical || align=right | 280 km || 
|-id=766 bgcolor=#C2E0FF
| 523766 ||  || — || August 25, 2010 || Haleakala || Pan-STARRS || plutino || align=right | 176 km || 
|-id=767 bgcolor=#C2E0FF
| 523767 ||  || — || November 3, 2010 || Haleakala || Pan-STARRS || SDO || align=right | 219 km || 
|-id=768 bgcolor=#C2E0FF
| 523768 ||  || — || January 27, 2011 || Haleakala || Pan-STARRS || plutinocritical || align=right | 333 km || 
|-id=769 bgcolor=#C2E0FF
| 523769 ||  || — || May 6, 2010 || Haleakala || Pan-STARRS || res2:5 || align=right | 344 km || 
|-id=770 bgcolor=#C2E0FF
| 523770 ||  || — || March 20, 2013 || Haleakala || Pan-STARRS || centaur || align=right | 111 km || 
|-id=771 bgcolor=#C2E0FF
| 523771 ||  || — || January 25, 2012 || Haleakala || Pan-STARRS || centaur || align=right | 169 km || 
|-id=772 bgcolor=#C2E0FF
| 523772 ||  || — || May 27, 2010 || Haleakala || Pan-STARRS || other TNO || align=right | 404 km || 
|-id=773 bgcolor=#C2E0FF
| 523773 ||  || — || November 15, 2010 || Haleakala || Pan-STARRS || other TNO || align=right | 374 km || 
|-id=774 bgcolor=#C2E0FF
| 523774 ||  || — || November 10, 2011 || Haleakala || Pan-STARRS || SDO || align=right | 271 km || 
|-id=775 bgcolor=#FFC2E0
| 523775 ||  || — || December 27, 2014 || Catalina || CSS || APOPHAmoon || align=right data-sort-value="0.28" | 280 m || 
|-id=776 bgcolor=#C2E0FF
| 523776 ||  || — || May 6, 2010 || Haleakala || Pan-STARRS || other TNO || align=right | 271 km || 
|-id=777 bgcolor=#C2E0FF
| 523777 ||  || — || November 21, 2010 || Haleakala || Pan-STARRS || SDO || align=right | 363 km || 
|-id=778 bgcolor=#C2E0FF
| 523778 ||  || — || January 27, 2011 || Haleakala || Pan-STARRS || SDO || align=right | 286 km || 
|-id=779 bgcolor=#FFC2E0
| 523779 ||  || — || May 31, 2014 || Haleakala || Pan-STARRS || AMO +1km || align=right data-sort-value="0.88" | 880 m || 
|-id=780 bgcolor=#C2E0FF
| 523780 ||  || — || January 24, 2011 || Haleakala || Pan-STARRS || other TNO || align=right | 404 km || 
|-id=781 bgcolor=#FFC2E0
| 523781 ||  || — || January 17, 2015 || Mount Lemmon || Mount Lemmon Survey || AMOcritical || align=right data-sort-value="0.37" | 370 m || 
|-id=782 bgcolor=#C7FF8F
| 523782 ||  || — || December 16, 2011 || Haleakala || Pan-STARRS || centaur || align=right | 56 km || 
|-id=783 bgcolor=#C7FF8F
| 523783 ||  || — || January 30, 2011 || Haleakala || Pan-STARRS || centaur || align=right | 17 km || 
|-id=784 bgcolor=#C7FF8F
| 523784 ||  || — || February 15, 2013 || Haleakala || Pan-STARRS || centaur || align=right | 94 km || 
|-id=785 bgcolor=#C7FF8F
| 523785 ||  || — || October 23, 2011 || Haleakala || Pan-STARRS || centaur || align=right | 12 km || 
|-id=786 bgcolor=#FFC2E0
| 523786 ||  || — || January 24, 2015 || Haleakala || Pan-STARRS || AMO || align=right data-sort-value="0.73" | 730 m || 
|-id=787 bgcolor=#C2E0FF
| 523787 ||  || — || January 26, 2014 || Haleakala || Pan-STARRS || centaurcritical || align=right | 122 km || 
|-id=788 bgcolor=#FFC2E0
| 523788 ||  || — || March 21, 2015 || Haleakala || Pan-STARRS || APOPHA || align=right data-sort-value="0.46" | 460 m || 
|-id=789 bgcolor=#C2E0FF
| 523789 ||  || — || April 27, 2012 || Haleakala || Pan-STARRS || other TNOcritical || align=right | 250 km || 
|-id=790 bgcolor=#C7FF8F
| 523790 ||  || — || June 1, 2010 || Haleakala || Pan-STARRS || centaur || align=right | 37 km || 
|-id=791 bgcolor=#C7FF8F
| 523791 ||  || — || December 16, 2011 || Haleakala || Pan-STARRS || centaur || align=right | 15 km || 
|-id=792 bgcolor=#FFC2E0
| 523792 ||  || — || June 17, 2015 || Haleakala || Pan-STARRS || APO || align=right data-sort-value="0.74" | 740 m || 
|-id=793 bgcolor=#C2E0FF
| 523793 ||  || — || August 24, 2013 || Haleakala || Pan-STARRS || other TNOcritical || align=right | 272 km || 
|-id=794 bgcolor=#C2E0FF
| 523794 ||  || — || September 9, 2015 || Mauna Kea || OSSOS || res2:9 || align=right | 671 km || 
|-id=795 bgcolor=#FFC2E0
| 523795 ||  || — || July 24, 1993 || Kitt Peak || Spacewatch || AMOcritical || align=right data-sort-value="0.30" | 300 m || 
|-id=796 bgcolor=#FFC2E0
| 523796 ||  || — || June 11, 2016 || Mount Lemmon || Mount Lemmon Survey || APOcritical || align=right data-sort-value="0.36" | 360 m || 
|-id=797 bgcolor=#C2E0FF
| 523797 ||  || — || November 1, 2012 || Haleakala || Pan-STARRS || centaurdamocloid || align=right | 23 km || 
|-id=798 bgcolor=#C2E0FF
| 523798 ||  || — || December 11, 2014 || Haleakala || Pan-STARRS || centaur || align=right | 27 km || 
|-id=799 bgcolor=#FFC2E0
| 523799 ||  || — || November 10, 2016 || Haleakala || Pan-STARRS || AMO +1km || align=right data-sort-value="0.95" | 950 m || 
|-id=800 bgcolor=#C2E0FF
| 523800 ||  || — || June 23, 2015 || Haleakala || Pan-STARRS || centaurdamocloid || align=right | 38 km || 
|}

523801–523900 

|-bgcolor=#FFC2E0
| 523801 ||  || — || October 11, 1993 || Kitt Peak || Spacewatch || AMO || align=right data-sort-value="0.36" | 360 m || 
|-id=802 bgcolor=#FFC2E0
| 523802 ||  || — || May 27, 1998 || Socorro || LINEAR || AMO || align=right data-sort-value="0.71" | 710 m || 
|-id=803 bgcolor=#FFC2E0
| 523803 ||  || — || September 5, 1999 || Catalina || CSS || AMOcritical || align=right data-sort-value="0.65" | 650 m || 
|-id=804 bgcolor=#FFC2E0
| 523804 ||  || — || December 22, 2000 || Haleakala || NEAT || APOPHA || align=right data-sort-value="0.32" | 320 m || 
|-id=805 bgcolor=#FFC2E0
| 523805 ||  || — || August 25, 2001 || Socorro || LINEAR || AMOcritical || align=right data-sort-value="0.37" | 370 m || 
|-id=806 bgcolor=#FFC2E0
| 523806 ||  || — || November 28, 2002 || Haleakala || NEAT || AMO +1kmcritical || align=right | 1.3 km || 
|-id=807 bgcolor=#FFC2E0
| 523807 ||  || — || June 2, 2003 || Anderson Mesa || LONEOS || APO || align=right data-sort-value="0.73" | 730 m || 
|-id=808 bgcolor=#FFC2E0
| 523808 ||  || — || June 21, 2007 || Mount Lemmon || Mount Lemmon Survey || ATEPHAcritical || align=right data-sort-value="0.49" | 490 m || 
|-id=809 bgcolor=#FFC2E0
| 523809 ||  || — || October 9, 2007 || Mount Lemmon || Mount Lemmon Survey || APOcritical || align=right data-sort-value="0.062" | 62 m || 
|-id=810 bgcolor=#FFC2E0
| 523810 ||  || — || September 9, 2008 || Kitt Peak || Spacewatch || APO +1km || align=right | 1.3 km || 
|-id=811 bgcolor=#FFC2E0
| 523811 ||  || — || October 3, 2008 || Mount Lemmon || Mount Lemmon Survey || AMOfast? || align=right data-sort-value="0.23" | 230 m || 
|-id=812 bgcolor=#FFC2E0
| 523812 ||  || — || October 6, 2008 || Mount Lemmon || Mount Lemmon Survey || AMOcritical || align=right data-sort-value="0.059" | 59 m || 
|-id=813 bgcolor=#FFC2E0
| 523813 ||  || — || November 3, 2008 || Kitt Peak || Spacewatch || APOPHA || align=right data-sort-value="0.26" | 260 m || 
|-id=814 bgcolor=#FFC2E0
| 523814 ||  || — || October 24, 2008 || Kitt Peak || Spacewatch || APOPHA || align=right data-sort-value="0.26" | 260 m || 
|-id=815 bgcolor=#FFC2E0
| 523815 ||  || — || April 22, 2009 || Mount Lemmon || Mount Lemmon Survey || AMO +1kmcritical || align=right | 1.1 km || 
|-id=816 bgcolor=#FFC2E0
| 523816 ||  || — || September 26, 2009 || Catalina || CSS || APO +1kmPHA || align=right data-sort-value="0.85" | 850 m || 
|-id=817 bgcolor=#FFC2E0
| 523817 ||  || — || October 8, 2009 || Siding Spring || SSS || AMOfast || align=right data-sort-value="0.12" | 120 m || 
|-id=818 bgcolor=#FFC2E0
| 523818 ||  || — || September 27, 2010 || Kitt Peak || Spacewatch || AMOPHAcritical || align=right data-sort-value="0.20" | 200 m || 
|-id=819 bgcolor=#FFC2E0
| 523819 ||  || — || November 8, 2010 || Catalina || CSS || AMOcritical || align=right data-sort-value="0.23" | 230 m || 
|-id=820 bgcolor=#FFC2E0
| 523820 ||  || — || April 3, 2011 || Haleakala || Pan-STARRS || APOPHA || align=right data-sort-value="0.78" | 780 m || 
|-id=821 bgcolor=#FFC2E0
| 523821 ||  || — || September 1, 2011 || Haleakala || Pan-STARRS || AMO || align=right data-sort-value="0.28" | 280 m || 
|-id=822 bgcolor=#FFC2E0
| 523822 ||  || — || February 28, 2012 || Haleakala || Pan-STARRS || APO +1kmcritical || align=right data-sort-value="0.86" | 860 m || 
|-id=823 bgcolor=#FFC2E0
| 523823 ||  || — || November 29, 2014 || Haleakala || Pan-STARRS || AMO || align=right data-sort-value="0.74" | 740 m || 
|-id=824 bgcolor=#FFC2E0
| 523824 ||  || — || September 3, 2016 || Mount Lemmon || Mount Lemmon Survey || AMO || align=right data-sort-value="0.42" | 420 m || 
|-id=825 bgcolor=#E9E9E9
| 523825 ||  || — || September 8, 1977 || Palomar || PLS ||  || align=right | 1.3 km || 
|-id=826 bgcolor=#FFC2E0
| 523826 ||  || — || October 24, 1990 || Kitt Peak || Spacewatch || AMO || align=right data-sort-value="0.3" | 300 m || 
|-id=827 bgcolor=#E9E9E9
| 523827 ||  || — || December 11, 1990 || Kitt Peak || Spacewatch ||  || align=right | 2.0 km || 
|-id=828 bgcolor=#FFC2E0
| 523828 ||  || — || January 24, 1992 || Palomar || K. J. Lawrence, E. F. Helin || APO || align=right data-sort-value="0.36" | 360 m || 
|-id=829 bgcolor=#E9E9E9
| 523829 ||  || — || January 21, 1993 || Kitt Peak || Spacewatch ||  || align=right | 1.3 km || 
|-id=830 bgcolor=#E9E9E9
| 523830 ||  || — || September 15, 1993 || Kitt Peak || Spacewatch ||  || align=right | 1.8 km || 
|-id=831 bgcolor=#d6d6d6
| 523831 ||  || — || January 7, 1994 || Kitt Peak || Spacewatch ||  || align=right | 3.1 km || 
|-id=832 bgcolor=#d6d6d6
| 523832 ||  || — || April 3, 1994 || Kitt Peak || Spacewatch ||  || align=right | 2.8 km || 
|-id=833 bgcolor=#d6d6d6
| 523833 ||  || — || September 2, 1994 || Kitt Peak || Spacewatch || 3:2 || align=right | 4.6 km || 
|-id=834 bgcolor=#d6d6d6
| 523834 ||  || — || September 12, 1994 || Kitt Peak || Spacewatch ||  || align=right | 2.9 km || 
|-id=835 bgcolor=#fefefe
| 523835 ||  || — || October 28, 1994 || Kitt Peak || Spacewatch ||  || align=right data-sort-value="0.85" | 850 m || 
|-id=836 bgcolor=#d6d6d6
| 523836 ||  || — || November 28, 1994 || Kitt Peak || Spacewatch ||  || align=right | 2.6 km || 
|-id=837 bgcolor=#fefefe
| 523837 ||  || — || January 29, 1995 || Kitt Peak || Spacewatch ||  || align=right data-sort-value="0.57" | 570 m || 
|-id=838 bgcolor=#d6d6d6
| 523838 ||  || — || January 31, 1995 || Kitt Peak || Spacewatch ||  || align=right | 2.1 km || 
|-id=839 bgcolor=#E9E9E9
| 523839 ||  || — || February 4, 1995 || Kitt Peak || Spacewatch ||  || align=right | 1.4 km || 
|-id=840 bgcolor=#E9E9E9
| 523840 ||  || — || March 23, 1995 || Kitt Peak || Spacewatch ||  || align=right | 1.2 km || 
|-id=841 bgcolor=#d6d6d6
| 523841 ||  || — || June 24, 1995 || Kitt Peak || Spacewatch ||  || align=right | 3.7 km || 
|-id=842 bgcolor=#E9E9E9
| 523842 ||  || — || July 22, 1995 || Kitt Peak || Spacewatch ||  || align=right | 1.2 km || 
|-id=843 bgcolor=#d6d6d6
| 523843 ||  || — || July 24, 1995 || Kitt Peak || Spacewatch ||  || align=right | 2.3 km || 
|-id=844 bgcolor=#d6d6d6
| 523844 ||  || — || July 26, 1995 || Kitt Peak || Spacewatch ||  || align=right | 2.9 km || 
|-id=845 bgcolor=#d6d6d6
| 523845 ||  || — || September 17, 1995 || Kitt Peak || Spacewatch ||  || align=right | 2.4 km || 
|-id=846 bgcolor=#E9E9E9
| 523846 ||  || — || September 19, 1995 || Kitt Peak || Spacewatch ||  || align=right | 2.3 km || 
|-id=847 bgcolor=#fefefe
| 523847 ||  || — || September 19, 1995 || Kitt Peak || Spacewatch ||  || align=right data-sort-value="0.64" | 640 m || 
|-id=848 bgcolor=#d6d6d6
| 523848 ||  || — || September 18, 1995 || Kitt Peak || Spacewatch ||  || align=right | 3.2 km || 
|-id=849 bgcolor=#d6d6d6
| 523849 ||  || — || September 26, 1995 || Kitt Peak || Spacewatch ||  || align=right | 2.6 km || 
|-id=850 bgcolor=#fefefe
| 523850 ||  || — || September 17, 1995 || Kitt Peak || Spacewatch ||  || align=right data-sort-value="0.65" | 650 m || 
|-id=851 bgcolor=#d6d6d6
| 523851 ||  || — || September 20, 1995 || Kitt Peak || Spacewatch ||  || align=right | 2.4 km || 
|-id=852 bgcolor=#E9E9E9
| 523852 ||  || — || September 21, 1995 || Kitt Peak || Spacewatch ||  || align=right | 1.9 km || 
|-id=853 bgcolor=#d6d6d6
| 523853 ||  || — || September 26, 1995 || Kitt Peak || Spacewatch ||  || align=right | 2.7 km || 
|-id=854 bgcolor=#fefefe
| 523854 ||  || — || September 22, 1995 || Kitt Peak || Spacewatch ||  || align=right data-sort-value="0.68" | 680 m || 
|-id=855 bgcolor=#E9E9E9
| 523855 ||  || — || September 26, 1995 || Kitt Peak || Spacewatch ||  || align=right | 2.4 km || 
|-id=856 bgcolor=#d6d6d6
| 523856 ||  || — || September 26, 1995 || Kitt Peak || Spacewatch ||  || align=right | 2.6 km || 
|-id=857 bgcolor=#d6d6d6
| 523857 ||  || — || October 15, 1995 || Kitt Peak || Spacewatch ||  || align=right | 2.8 km || 
|-id=858 bgcolor=#E9E9E9
| 523858 ||  || — || October 19, 1995 || Kitt Peak || Spacewatch ||  || align=right | 2.3 km || 
|-id=859 bgcolor=#d6d6d6
| 523859 ||  || — || October 20, 1995 || Kitt Peak || Spacewatch ||  || align=right | 2.9 km || 
|-id=860 bgcolor=#fefefe
| 523860 ||  || — || October 21, 1995 || Kitt Peak || Spacewatch || H || align=right data-sort-value="0.46" | 460 m || 
|-id=861 bgcolor=#d6d6d6
| 523861 ||  || — || October 23, 1995 || Kitt Peak || Spacewatch ||  || align=right | 4.5 km || 
|-id=862 bgcolor=#d6d6d6
| 523862 ||  || — || October 17, 1995 || Kitt Peak || Spacewatch ||  || align=right | 2.3 km || 
|-id=863 bgcolor=#d6d6d6
| 523863 ||  || — || October 21, 1995 || Kitt Peak || Spacewatch ||  || align=right | 2.4 km || 
|-id=864 bgcolor=#E9E9E9
| 523864 ||  || — || October 21, 1995 || Kitt Peak || Spacewatch ||  || align=right | 1.4 km || 
|-id=865 bgcolor=#d6d6d6
| 523865 ||  || — || October 22, 1995 || Kitt Peak || Spacewatch || THM || align=right | 1.7 km || 
|-id=866 bgcolor=#E9E9E9
| 523866 ||  || — || October 25, 1995 || Kitt Peak || Spacewatch || GAL || align=right | 1.2 km || 
|-id=867 bgcolor=#fefefe
| 523867 ||  || — || November 14, 1995 || Kitt Peak || Spacewatch ||  || align=right data-sort-value="0.78" | 780 m || 
|-id=868 bgcolor=#d6d6d6
| 523868 ||  || — || November 14, 1995 || Kitt Peak || Spacewatch ||  || align=right | 3.4 km || 
|-id=869 bgcolor=#fefefe
| 523869 ||  || — || November 16, 1995 || Kitt Peak || Spacewatch ||  || align=right data-sort-value="0.62" | 620 m || 
|-id=870 bgcolor=#E9E9E9
| 523870 ||  || — || November 18, 1995 || Kitt Peak || Spacewatch ||  || align=right | 1.2 km || 
|-id=871 bgcolor=#fefefe
| 523871 ||  || — || November 21, 1995 || Kitt Peak || Spacewatch ||  || align=right data-sort-value="0.65" | 650 m || 
|-id=872 bgcolor=#d6d6d6
| 523872 ||  || — || December 22, 1995 || Kitt Peak || Spacewatch ||  || align=right | 4.0 km || 
|-id=873 bgcolor=#d6d6d6
| 523873 ||  || — || January 13, 1996 || Kitt Peak || Spacewatch ||  || align=right | 3.1 km || 
|-id=874 bgcolor=#d6d6d6
| 523874 ||  || — || February 10, 1996 || Kitt Peak || Spacewatch ||  || align=right | 2.7 km || 
|-id=875 bgcolor=#E9E9E9
| 523875 ||  || — || March 11, 1996 || Kitt Peak || Spacewatch ||  || align=right | 2.1 km || 
|-id=876 bgcolor=#fefefe
| 523876 ||  || — || May 12, 1996 || Kitt Peak || Spacewatch ||  || align=right data-sort-value="0.70" | 700 m || 
|-id=877 bgcolor=#E9E9E9
| 523877 ||  || — || May 12, 1996 || Kitt Peak || Spacewatch ||  || align=right | 1.1 km || 
|-id=878 bgcolor=#E9E9E9
| 523878 ||  || — || May 12, 1996 || Kitt Peak || Spacewatch ||  || align=right | 2.6 km || 
|-id=879 bgcolor=#d6d6d6
| 523879 ||  || — || September 7, 1996 || Kitt Peak || Spacewatch ||  || align=right | 1.7 km || 
|-id=880 bgcolor=#E9E9E9
| 523880 ||  || — || September 8, 1996 || Kitt Peak || Spacewatch ||  || align=right | 1.1 km || 
|-id=881 bgcolor=#E9E9E9
| 523881 ||  || — || October 4, 1996 || Kitt Peak || Spacewatch ||  || align=right | 1.4 km || 
|-id=882 bgcolor=#E9E9E9
| 523882 ||  || — || October 7, 1996 || Kitt Peak || Spacewatch ||  || align=right | 1.1 km || 
|-id=883 bgcolor=#d6d6d6
| 523883 ||  || — || October 9, 1996 || Kitt Peak || Spacewatch ||  || align=right | 3.1 km || 
|-id=884 bgcolor=#E9E9E9
| 523884 ||  || — || October 9, 1996 || Kitt Peak || Spacewatch ||  || align=right | 1.7 km || 
|-id=885 bgcolor=#E9E9E9
| 523885 ||  || — || October 12, 1996 || Kitt Peak || Spacewatch ||  || align=right | 1.2 km || 
|-id=886 bgcolor=#d6d6d6
| 523886 ||  || — || October 5, 1996 || Kitt Peak || Spacewatch ||  || align=right | 2.4 km || 
|-id=887 bgcolor=#d6d6d6
| 523887 ||  || — || October 6, 1996 || Kitt Peak || Spacewatch ||  || align=right | 2.6 km || 
|-id=888 bgcolor=#fefefe
| 523888 ||  || — || November 3, 1996 || Kitt Peak || Spacewatch ||  || align=right data-sort-value="0.60" | 600 m || 
|-id=889 bgcolor=#E9E9E9
| 523889 ||  || — || November 4, 1996 || Kitt Peak || Spacewatch ||  || align=right | 2.1 km || 
|-id=890 bgcolor=#E9E9E9
| 523890 ||  || — || November 5, 1996 || Kitt Peak || Spacewatch ||  || align=right | 1.2 km || 
|-id=891 bgcolor=#d6d6d6
| 523891 ||  || — || November 6, 1996 || Kitt Peak || Spacewatch ||  || align=right | 1.9 km || 
|-id=892 bgcolor=#d6d6d6
| 523892 ||  || — || November 4, 1996 || Kitt Peak || Spacewatch ||  || align=right | 2.6 km || 
|-id=893 bgcolor=#fefefe
| 523893 ||  || — || November 4, 1996 || Kitt Peak || Spacewatch ||  || align=right data-sort-value="0.71" | 710 m || 
|-id=894 bgcolor=#fefefe
| 523894 ||  || — || November 9, 1996 || Kitt Peak || Spacewatch ||  || align=right data-sort-value="0.55" | 550 m || 
|-id=895 bgcolor=#d6d6d6
| 523895 ||  || — || November 10, 1996 || Kitt Peak || Spacewatch ||  || align=right | 2.3 km || 
|-id=896 bgcolor=#d6d6d6
| 523896 ||  || — || December 9, 1996 || Kitt Peak || Spacewatch ||  || align=right | 2.7 km || 
|-id=897 bgcolor=#d6d6d6
| 523897 ||  || — || December 11, 1996 || Kitt Peak || Spacewatch ||  || align=right | 3.2 km || 
|-id=898 bgcolor=#E9E9E9
| 523898 ||  || — || January 3, 1997 || Kitt Peak || Spacewatch ||  || align=right | 1.4 km || 
|-id=899 bgcolor=#C2E0FF
| 523899 ||  || — || February 6, 1997 || Mauna Kea || J. Chen, C. Trujillo, D. C. Jewitt, J. X. Luu || cubewano? || align=right | 154 km || 
|-id=900 bgcolor=#fefefe
| 523900 ||  || — || March 4, 1997 || Kitt Peak || Spacewatch ||  || align=right data-sort-value="0.73" | 730 m || 
|}

523901–524000 

|-bgcolor=#fefefe
| 523901 ||  || — || March 8, 1997 || Kitt Peak || Spacewatch ||  || align=right data-sort-value="0.77" | 770 m || 
|-id=902 bgcolor=#fefefe
| 523902 ||  || — || March 30, 1997 || Kitt Peak || Spacewatch ||  || align=right | 1.1 km || 
|-id=903 bgcolor=#fefefe
| 523903 ||  || — || April 7, 1997 || Kitt Peak || Spacewatch ||  || align=right data-sort-value="0.52" | 520 m || 
|-id=904 bgcolor=#C2FFFF
| 523904 ||  || — || May 5, 1997 || Kitt Peak || Spacewatch || L5 || align=right | 10 km || 
|-id=905 bgcolor=#d6d6d6
| 523905 ||  || — || June 26, 1997 || Kitt Peak || Spacewatch ||  || align=right | 3.6 km || 
|-id=906 bgcolor=#E9E9E9
| 523906 ||  || — || August 31, 1997 || Caussols || ODAS ||  || align=right | 1.0 km || 
|-id=907 bgcolor=#d6d6d6
| 523907 ||  || — || September 23, 1997 || Kitt Peak || Spacewatch ||  || align=right | 2.8 km || 
|-id=908 bgcolor=#fefefe
| 523908 ||  || — || September 23, 1997 || Kitt Peak || Spacewatch ||  || align=right data-sort-value="0.59" | 590 m || 
|-id=909 bgcolor=#d6d6d6
| 523909 ||  || — || September 27, 1997 || Kitt Peak || Spacewatch ||  || align=right | 1.9 km || 
|-id=910 bgcolor=#fefefe
| 523910 ||  || — || September 28, 1997 || Kitt Peak || Spacewatch ||  || align=right data-sort-value="0.67" | 670 m || 
|-id=911 bgcolor=#E9E9E9
| 523911 ||  || — || September 27, 1997 || Caussols || ODAS ||  || align=right data-sort-value="0.94" | 940 m || 
|-id=912 bgcolor=#E9E9E9
| 523912 ||  || — || September 29, 1997 || Kitt Peak || Spacewatch ||  || align=right | 1.5 km || 
|-id=913 bgcolor=#d6d6d6
| 523913 ||  || — || September 28, 1997 || Kitt Peak || Spacewatch ||  || align=right | 2.0 km || 
|-id=914 bgcolor=#d6d6d6
| 523914 ||  || — || October 25, 1997 || Kitt Peak || Spacewatch ||  || align=right | 2.9 km || 
|-id=915 bgcolor=#FFC2E0
| 523915 ||  || — || November 6, 1997 || Socorro || LINEAR || APO +1km || align=right data-sort-value="0.81" | 810 m || 
|-id=916 bgcolor=#d6d6d6
| 523916 ||  || — || March 16, 2004 || Kitt Peak || Spacewatch ||  || align=right | 2.5 km || 
|-id=917 bgcolor=#E9E9E9
| 523917 ||  || — || November 20, 1997 || Kitt Peak || Spacewatch ||  || align=right data-sort-value="0.69" | 690 m || 
|-id=918 bgcolor=#d6d6d6
| 523918 ||  || — || November 23, 1997 || Kitt Peak || Spacewatch ||  || align=right | 3.5 km || 
|-id=919 bgcolor=#fefefe
| 523919 ||  || — || November 23, 1997 || Kitt Peak || Spacewatch ||  || align=right data-sort-value="0.51" | 510 m || 
|-id=920 bgcolor=#fefefe
| 523920 ||  || — || December 31, 1997 || Kitt Peak || Spacewatch ||  || align=right data-sort-value="0.81" | 810 m || 
|-id=921 bgcolor=#d6d6d6
| 523921 ||  || — || January 2, 1998 || Kitt Peak || Spacewatch ||  || align=right | 3.0 km || 
|-id=922 bgcolor=#E9E9E9
| 523922 ||  || — || January 22, 1998 || Kitt Peak || Spacewatch ||  || align=right | 1.2 km || 
|-id=923 bgcolor=#E9E9E9
| 523923 ||  || — || January 24, 1998 || Kitt Peak || Spacewatch ||  || align=right | 1.2 km || 
|-id=924 bgcolor=#fefefe
| 523924 ||  || — || January 23, 1998 || Kitt Peak || Spacewatch ||  || align=right data-sort-value="0.54" | 540 m || 
|-id=925 bgcolor=#d6d6d6
| 523925 ||  || — || January 25, 1998 || Kitt Peak || Spacewatch ||  || align=right | 2.8 km || 
|-id=926 bgcolor=#d6d6d6
| 523926 ||  || — || January 31, 1998 || Kitt Peak || Spacewatch ||  || align=right | 2.3 km || 
|-id=927 bgcolor=#fefefe
| 523927 ||  || — || February 23, 1998 || Kitt Peak || Spacewatch ||  || align=right data-sort-value="0.88" | 880 m || 
|-id=928 bgcolor=#d6d6d6
| 523928 ||  || — || February 23, 1998 || Kitt Peak || Spacewatch ||  || align=right | 2.8 km || 
|-id=929 bgcolor=#fefefe
| 523929 ||  || — || February 23, 1998 || Kitt Peak || Spacewatch ||  || align=right data-sort-value="0.82" | 820 m || 
|-id=930 bgcolor=#fefefe
| 523930 ||  || — || March 3, 1998 || Kitt Peak || Spacewatch ||  || align=right data-sort-value="0.98" | 980 m || 
|-id=931 bgcolor=#d6d6d6
| 523931 ||  || — || March 1, 1998 || Kitt Peak || Spacewatch ||  || align=right | 2.8 km || 
|-id=932 bgcolor=#d6d6d6
| 523932 ||  || — || March 2, 1998 || Kitt Peak || Spacewatch ||  || align=right | 3.4 km || 
|-id=933 bgcolor=#fefefe
| 523933 ||  || — || March 18, 1998 || Kitt Peak || Spacewatch ||  || align=right data-sort-value="0.63" | 630 m || 
|-id=934 bgcolor=#FFC2E0
| 523934 ||  || — || March 24, 1998 || Socorro || LINEAR || APOPHA || align=right data-sort-value="0.27" | 270 m || 
|-id=935 bgcolor=#E9E9E9
| 523935 ||  || — || March 29, 1998 || Socorro || LINEAR ||  || align=right | 1.9 km || 
|-id=936 bgcolor=#E9E9E9
| 523936 ||  || — || April 4, 1998 || Kitt Peak || Spacewatch ||  || align=right data-sort-value="0.86" | 860 m || 
|-id=937 bgcolor=#E9E9E9
| 523937 ||  || — || April 17, 1998 || Kitt Peak || Spacewatch ||  || align=right | 1.8 km || 
|-id=938 bgcolor=#fefefe
| 523938 ||  || — || April 19, 1998 || Kitt Peak || Spacewatch ||  || align=right data-sort-value="0.77" | 770 m || 
|-id=939 bgcolor=#fefefe
| 523939 ||  || — || April 19, 1998 || Kitt Peak || Spacewatch ||  || align=right data-sort-value="0.58" | 580 m || 
|-id=940 bgcolor=#E9E9E9
| 523940 ||  || — || April 22, 1998 || Kitt Peak || Spacewatch ||  || align=right | 1.0 km || 
|-id=941 bgcolor=#FFC2E0
| 523941 ||  || — || April 29, 1998 || Kitt Peak || Spacewatch || APOcritical || align=right data-sort-value="0.12" | 120 m || 
|-id=942 bgcolor=#fefefe
| 523942 ||  || — || May 28, 1998 || Kitt Peak || Spacewatch ||  || align=right | 2.8 km || 
|-id=943 bgcolor=#E9E9E9
| 523943 ||  || — || May 23, 1998 || Socorro || LINEAR ||  || align=right | 2.1 km || 
|-id=944 bgcolor=#d6d6d6
| 523944 ||  || — || August 30, 1998 || Kitt Peak || Spacewatch ||  || align=right | 2.9 km || 
|-id=945 bgcolor=#FFC2E0
| 523945 ||  || — || September 14, 1998 || Socorro || LINEAR || AMOcritical || align=right data-sort-value="0.65" | 650 m || 
|-id=946 bgcolor=#fefefe
| 523946 ||  || — || August 26, 1998 || Kitt Peak || Spacewatch ||  || align=right data-sort-value="0.75" | 750 m || 
|-id=947 bgcolor=#E9E9E9
| 523947 ||  || — || September 15, 1998 || Kitt Peak || Spacewatch ||  || align=right | 1.5 km || 
|-id=948 bgcolor=#E9E9E9
| 523948 ||  || — || September 20, 1998 || Kitt Peak || Spacewatch ||  || align=right | 2.3 km || 
|-id=949 bgcolor=#E9E9E9
| 523949 ||  || — || September 19, 1998 || Caussols || ODAS ||  || align=right | 3.0 km || 
|-id=950 bgcolor=#FFC2E0
| 523950 ||  || — || September 21, 1998 || Socorro || LINEAR || ATEPHAcritical || align=right data-sort-value="0.32" | 320 m || 
|-id=951 bgcolor=#fefefe
| 523951 ||  || — || September 27, 1998 || Kitt Peak || Spacewatch ||  || align=right data-sort-value="0.66" | 660 m || 
|-id=952 bgcolor=#E9E9E9
| 523952 ||  || — || October 14, 1998 || Kitt Peak || Spacewatch ||  || align=right | 1.8 km || 
|-id=953 bgcolor=#fefefe
| 523953 ||  || — || October 20, 1998 || Caussols || ODAS ||  || align=right data-sort-value="0.64" | 640 m || 
|-id=954 bgcolor=#fefefe
| 523954 Guman ||  ||  || October 22, 1998 || Piszkéstető || K. Sárneczky, G. Szabó ||  || align=right data-sort-value="0.48" | 480 m || 
|-id=955 bgcolor=#C2E0FF
| 523955 ||  || — || October 22, 1998 || Kitt Peak || M. W. Buie || res3:4 || align=right | 147 km || 
|-id=956 bgcolor=#d6d6d6
| 523956 ||  || — || October 24, 1998 || Kitt Peak || Spacewatch ||  || align=right | 1.8 km || 
|-id=957 bgcolor=#E9E9E9
| 523957 ||  || — || October 24, 1998 || Kitt Peak || Spacewatch ||  || align=right | 2.2 km || 
|-id=958 bgcolor=#fefefe
| 523958 ||  || — || October 20, 1998 || Kitt Peak || Spacewatch ||  || align=right data-sort-value="0.77" | 770 m || 
|-id=959 bgcolor=#d6d6d6
| 523959 ||  || — || October 24, 1998 || Kitt Peak || Spacewatch ||  || align=right | 2.8 km || 
|-id=960 bgcolor=#d6d6d6
| 523960 ||  || — || November 15, 1998 || Kitt Peak || Spacewatch ||  || align=right | 4.6 km || 
|-id=961 bgcolor=#fefefe
| 523961 ||  || — || November 15, 1998 || Kitt Peak || Spacewatch ||  || align=right data-sort-value="0.87" | 870 m || 
|-id=962 bgcolor=#fefefe
| 523962 ||  || — || November 15, 1998 || Kitt Peak || Spacewatch ||  || align=right data-sort-value="0.76" | 760 m || 
|-id=963 bgcolor=#fefefe
| 523963 ||  || — || November 19, 1998 || Kitt Peak || Spacewatch ||  || align=right data-sort-value="0.64" | 640 m || 
|-id=964 bgcolor=#E9E9E9
| 523964 ||  || — || November 16, 1998 || Kitt Peak || Spacewatch ||  || align=right | 1.9 km || 
|-id=965 bgcolor=#C2E0FF
| 523965 ||  || — || December 12, 1998 || La Palma || A. Fitzsimmons, E. Fletcher || SDO || align=right | 238 km || 
|-id=966 bgcolor=#FFC2E0
| 523966 ||  || — || December 22, 1998 || Kitt Peak || Spacewatch || AMOcritical || align=right data-sort-value="0.27" | 270 m || 
|-id=967 bgcolor=#FFC2E0
| 523967 ||  || — || December 23, 1998 || Socorro || LINEAR || AMO +1km || align=right data-sort-value="0.80" | 800 m || 
|-id=968 bgcolor=#d6d6d6
| 523968 ||  || — || December 22, 1998 || Kitt Peak || Spacewatch ||  || align=right | 3.3 km || 
|-id=969 bgcolor=#E9E9E9
| 523969 ||  || — || January 9, 1999 || Kitt Peak || Spacewatch ||  || align=right | 1.3 km || 
|-id=970 bgcolor=#d6d6d6
| 523970 ||  || — || January 14, 1999 || Kitt Peak || Spacewatch ||  || align=right | 2.9 km || 
|-id=971 bgcolor=#FFC2E0
| 523971 ||  || — || January 15, 1999 || Kitt Peak || Spacewatch || APO || align=right data-sort-value="0.19" | 190 m || 
|-id=972 bgcolor=#FFC2E0
| 523972 ||  || — || February 12, 1999 || Socorro || LINEAR || APO || align=right data-sort-value="0.68" | 680 m || 
|-id=973 bgcolor=#fefefe
| 523973 ||  || — || February 7, 1999 || Kitt Peak || Spacewatch ||  || align=right | 1.2 km || 
|-id=974 bgcolor=#d6d6d6
| 523974 ||  || — || February 8, 1999 || Kitt Peak || Spacewatch ||  || align=right | 3.1 km || 
|-id=975 bgcolor=#d6d6d6
| 523975 ||  || — || February 8, 1999 || Kitt Peak || Spacewatch ||  || align=right | 2.1 km || 
|-id=976 bgcolor=#d6d6d6
| 523976 ||  || — || February 10, 1999 || Kitt Peak || Spacewatch ||  || align=right | 3.0 km || 
|-id=977 bgcolor=#fefefe
| 523977 ||  || — || March 10, 1999 || Kitt Peak || Spacewatch || H || align=right data-sort-value="0.71" | 710 m || 
|-id=978 bgcolor=#d6d6d6
| 523978 ||  || — || March 14, 1999 || Kitt Peak || Spacewatch ||  || align=right | 3.5 km || 
|-id=979 bgcolor=#d6d6d6
| 523979 ||  || — || March 20, 1999 || Kitt Peak || Spacewatch ||  || align=right | 3.9 km || 
|-id=980 bgcolor=#E9E9E9
| 523980 ||  || — || March 27, 1995 || Kitt Peak || Spacewatch ||  || align=right | 1.2 km || 
|-id=981 bgcolor=#fefefe
| 523981 ||  || — || July 13, 1999 || Socorro || LINEAR ||  || align=right | 1.3 km || 
|-id=982 bgcolor=#d6d6d6
| 523982 ||  || — || September 3, 1999 || Kitt Peak || Spacewatch ||  || align=right | 2.7 km || 
|-id=983 bgcolor=#C2E0FF
| 523983 ||  || — || September 6, 1999 || Mauna Kea || D. C. Jewitt, J. X. Luu, C. Trujillo || cubewano?moon || align=right | 147 km || 
|-id=984 bgcolor=#fefefe
| 523984 ||  || — || September 5, 1999 || Kitt Peak || Spacewatch ||  || align=right data-sort-value="0.79" | 790 m || 
|-id=985 bgcolor=#E9E9E9
| 523985 ||  || — || October 3, 1999 || Kitt Peak || Spacewatch ||  || align=right | 2.3 km || 
|-id=986 bgcolor=#fefefe
| 523986 ||  || — || September 30, 1999 || Kitt Peak || Spacewatch ||  || align=right data-sort-value="0.62" | 620 m || 
|-id=987 bgcolor=#E9E9E9
| 523987 ||  || — || October 6, 1999 || Kitt Peak || Spacewatch ||  || align=right | 1.9 km || 
|-id=988 bgcolor=#fefefe
| 523988 ||  || — || October 6, 1999 || Socorro || LINEAR ||  || align=right data-sort-value="0.86" | 860 m || 
|-id=989 bgcolor=#E9E9E9
| 523989 ||  || — || October 9, 1999 || Kitt Peak || Spacewatch ||  || align=right | 1.0 km || 
|-id=990 bgcolor=#d6d6d6
| 523990 ||  || — || October 9, 1999 || Kitt Peak || Spacewatch ||  || align=right | 3.1 km || 
|-id=991 bgcolor=#E9E9E9
| 523991 ||  || — || October 3, 1999 || Kitt Peak || Spacewatch ||  || align=right | 1.5 km || 
|-id=992 bgcolor=#E9E9E9
| 523992 ||  || — || October 10, 1999 || Kitt Peak || Spacewatch ||  || align=right | 2.7 km || 
|-id=993 bgcolor=#fefefe
| 523993 ||  || — || October 7, 1999 || Kitt Peak || Spacewatch ||  || align=right data-sort-value="0.82" | 820 m || 
|-id=994 bgcolor=#E9E9E9
| 523994 ||  || — || October 11, 1999 || Kitt Peak || Spacewatch ||  || align=right | 1.6 km || 
|-id=995 bgcolor=#d6d6d6
| 523995 ||  || — || October 12, 1999 || Kitt Peak || Spacewatch ||  || align=right | 2.8 km || 
|-id=996 bgcolor=#E9E9E9
| 523996 ||  || — || October 5, 1999 || Socorro || LINEAR ||  || align=right | 1.7 km || 
|-id=997 bgcolor=#E9E9E9
| 523997 ||  || — || September 18, 1999 || Kitt Peak || Spacewatch ||  || align=right | 1.6 km || 
|-id=998 bgcolor=#fefefe
| 523998 ||  || — || October 6, 1999 || Socorro || LINEAR ||  || align=right data-sort-value="0.77" | 770 m || 
|-id=999 bgcolor=#fefefe
| 523999 ||  || — || October 10, 1999 || Socorro || LINEAR ||  || align=right data-sort-value="0.94" | 940 m || 
|-id=000 bgcolor=#fefefe
| 524000 ||  || — || October 4, 1999 || Kitt Peak || Spacewatch ||  || align=right data-sort-value="0.70" | 700 m || 
|}

References

External links 
 Discovery Circumstances: Numbered Minor Planets (520001)–(525000) (IAU Minor Planet Center)

0523